= Joy Murphy Wandin =

Australian activist

Joy Murphy Wandin AO is an Indigenous Australian, Senior Wurundjeri elder of the Kulin alliance in Victoria, Australia. She has given the traditional welcome to country greeting at many Melbourne events and to many distinguished visitors where she says in the Woiwurrung language "Wominjeka Wurundjeri Balluk yearmenn koondee bik" ("Welcome to the land of the Wurundjeri people").

Born in Healesville, Joy Murphy Wandin's family never left Wurundjeri land and she is the great-great niece to William Barak, the last traditional ngurungaeta of the Wurundjeri-willam clan. Her older brother (Juby) James Wandin, who once played football with St Kilda Football Club in the 1950s, was the ngurungaeta of the Wurundjeri until his death in February 2006.

Her father, Jarlo Wandoon, tried to enlist for World War 1, but was rejected due to being an Aboriginal person. When he attempted to enlist under his whitefella name, James Wandin, he was accepted into the army and served overseas and is listed under that name on the honour roll in the Healesville RSL. Joy Murphy Wandin told the story of her father's enlistment, and subsequent dispossession and separation from family with the closure of Coranderrk, in 1923 in her Welcome to country speech when John Howard, as Australian Prime Minister, visited Healesville.

== Roles in leadership ==
Her other roles include an honorary professor at Swinburne University, chair of the Wilin Centre for Indigenous Arts and Cultural Development at the Victorian College of the Arts University of Melbourne, co-patron for Keeping Koori Kids in Catholic Education and patron for Parliament of World Religions. She is also an ambassador for BreastScreen Victoria, Australia Day Victoria and an Animis Ambassador for Zoos Victoria. In the past she has been a trustee of the National Gallery of Victoria, a member of the Equal Opportunity Commission Victoria, a member of the Victoria Police Ethical Standards Consultative Committee.

== Musical collaborations ==
In 2001, she collaborated with didgeridoo player Mark Atkins (musician) and composer Philip Glass in the concert work Voices, performed at the Melbourne Town Hall and New York's Lincoln Center. The composition was commissioned by the City of Melbourne to relaunch the Melbourne Town Hall Organ. Wandin wrote the accompanying text which she narrated in four parts with the music in the performance.

She was the creative artist for projects and lyricist for the Opening and Closing songs in the 2006 Commonwealth Games held in Melbourne through her consultancy business Jarlo Visions.

In 2011, she performed the Welcome to Country ceremony at the opening of a Scientology facility in Melbourne, "welcoming Scientologists to the lands of her ancestors".

== Books ==
- Murphy, Aunty Joy; Kennedy, Lisa (illustrator) (2016). Welcome to Country. Black Dog Books. ISBN 9781922244871.
- Murphy, Aunty Joy; Kelly, Andrew; Kennedy, Lisa (illustrator) (2019). Wilam. Black Dog Books. ISBN 9781925381764.

== Films ==
- Murphy-Wandin, Aunty Joy; Arnold, Josie; Yammouni, David (2016). Wurundjeri Women and Sport. Swinburne University.

== Awards ==
Wandin was inducted onto the Victorian Honour Roll of Women in 2001. In 2002, she was awarded the Victorian Aboriginal Women's Award for being involved with Aboriginal Issues for thirty years. In 2006 she was made an officer of the Order of Australia "for her service to the community, particularly the Aborigines, through significant contributions in the fields of social justice, land rights, equal opportunity, art and reconciliation". She dedicated the award to her husband of 25 years, Peter Kaal, who died of an unexpected illness in October 2005.
