= Mount William stone axe quarry =

Aboriginal Australian archaeological site in Central Victoria, Australia

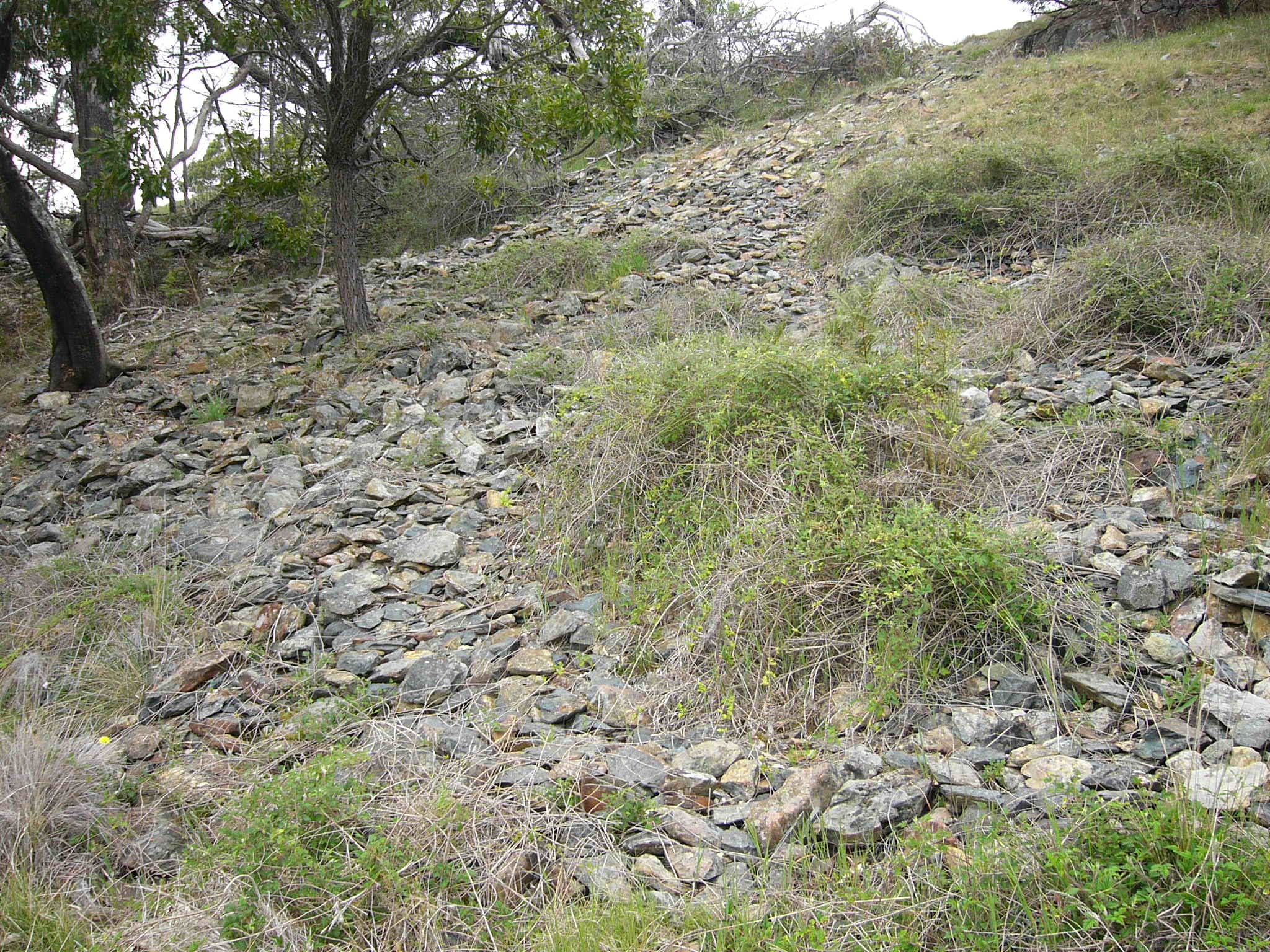
Mount William Quarry

The Mount William stone axe quarry (traditionally known as Wil-im-ee moor-ing) is an Aboriginal Australian archaeological site in Central Victoria, Australia. It is located 9 kilometres (5.6 mi) northeast of Lancefield, off Powells Track, 10 kilometres (6.2 mi) north of Romsey and 78 kilometres (48 mi) from Melbourne. Known as Wil-im-ee moor-ring, meaning "axe place" in the Woiwurrung language, the greenstone quarry was an important source of raw material for the manufacture of greenstone ground-edge axes, which were traded over a wide area of south-east Australia.

== Description ==
The Mount William Aboriginal stone axe quarry comprises the remains of hundreds of mining pits and the mounds of waste rock where Aboriginal people obtained greenstone (diabase), and manufactured stone blanks for axe heads. Chipped and ground stone axes or hatchets were an essential part of Aboriginal toolkits in southeast Australia, with the Mount William greenstone being one of the most prized and extensively traded materials. The stone was quarried from the source outcrops, and roughly flaked into blanks, then taken away for finer flaking and grinding the edge. There are 268 mining pits, 18 of which are several metres deep, surrounded by at least 34 discrete flaking floors, with mounds of debris up to 20 metres in diameter and some featuring a central outcropping rock used as an anvil.

Mount William lies within one of six Cambrian greenstone belts in Victoria where several other greenstone quarries have also been found including Mount Camel, Howqua River, Cosgrove, Jallukar, Berrambool and Baronga on the Hopkins River; and Ceres and Dog Rocks near Geelong. However, none of the axes at Mount William have been ground and polished into finished hatchet heads. The nearest axe grinding grooves can be found at Mount Macedon, about 29 kilometres away, where analysis of stone fragments showed they were the same diabase stone as the Mount William greenstone.

== History ==
William Bradley appears to have been the first to describe the exchange of Mount William stone on 12 November 1838:

Today two tribes met at the encampment by the deep hole in the creek The stranger groups as I will call them had travelled from the south and they had carried with them a number [of] stone hatchets. Some of these hatchets were polished while others were still quite rough and I imagine still require further work. The tribes who are camped on the creek were eager to obtain these hatchets and in return for one polished axe they gave two of their opossum skin covers. For a hatchet still in a roughened state they gave in return a number of their light bamboo spears. This bartering as I shall call it went on for some time, but only amongst the menfolk.

In 1854 William Blandowski, the first zoologist at the Melbourne Museum, visited Mount William and provided the first written description: The celebrated spot which supplies the natives with stone (phonolite) for their tomahawks, and of which I had been informed by the tribes 400 miles distant. Having observed on the tops of these hills a multitude of fragments of stones which appeared to have been broken artificially. Here I unexpectedly found the deserted quarries (kinohahm) of the aboriginals... which extend over an area of upwards of one hundred acres, present an appearance somewhat similar to that of a deserted goldfield, and convey a faithful idea of the great determination displayed by the aboriginals.

William Buckley, described a hard black stone he called Kar-keen which was shaped into stone heads.

In the 1880s prominent Wurundjeri leader and custodian of the quarry, William Barak (who probably witnessed the final operations at the quarry) described the traditional ownership and access conventions to ethnographer, Alfred Howitt.

There were places in which the whole tribe had a special interest. Such a place was the "stone quarry" at Mount William... which had a network of leading men who jointly had custodial rights in the quarry... where the leading men of two intermarrying clans: the Kurnung-willam clan and the Kurnaje-berreing clan which were two of three clans that made up the Wurundjeri. There were four men who acquired the responsibility of ownership and control of the quarry: Ningu-labul and Nurrum-nurrum-bin of the Kurnung-willam clan and Billi-billeri and Bebejan of Kurnaje-berreing clan. Billi-billeri was the headman in occupation of the site... When neighbouring tribes wanted stone for tomahawks they usually sent a messenger for Billibellary [the main custodian]. When they arrived they camped around about the place. Billi-billeri's father when he was alive split up the stones and gave it away for presents such as 'rugs, weapons, ornaments, belts, necklaces.

Organised excursions were popular in the early 1900s, as when the District Teachers Association organised an excursion in 1906 and the day was "proclaimed a public holiday in the Shire of Lancefield (sic), so that an opportunity will be afforded to all to be present."

In the 1940s, Fred McCarthy identified a south-east Australia route associated with Mount William among his seven trunk-trade routes.

...the south-east Australia route extends from south and central Queensland down the Paroo and Warrego River to the Darling, which it follows to the Murray River and links up with the barter along this river; it then passes down the Lower Murray where it connects with a route from central Victoria (Mount William), and at Lake Alexandrina joins the Glenelg River-Coorong-Port Augusta-Lake Eyre route.

In the 1960s and 1970s, Mt William drew the attention of anthropologists and archaeologists (notably including Donald Thomson and Isabel McBryde). McBryde's study of trade systems in the 1970s included investigation of the distribution of axes from Mount William and other quarries in Victoria and New South Wales drawing on ethno-historical sources, linguistic and archaeological evidence and petrological studies (using thin section analysis for axes from archaeological sites and stone sources), to reveal distribution trends and social value.

McBryde showed Aboriginal exchange networks for Mount William stone extended several hundred kilometres. with distribution determined by the social and political relations between the Kulin and neighbouring groups: sparsely distributed or absent in south-eastern Victoria but more widely distributed in Western Victoria.

== Management and conservation ==
Mount William had long been recognised as a special Aboriginal place when the first attempt was made to provide some formal protection in 1910. The Director of the Museum of Victoria, Baldwin Spencer, sought to establish a committee in association with the Historical Society of Victoria to purchase a portion of the area to form a reserve. However the landowner declined to sell.

In 1917 Allan F. Cameron, Member for Dalhousie in the Victorian Parliament considered that: Something like twenty-five acres of land could be procured at a reasonable price, and fenced in, to be held for all time as the great historic landmark of Australia, furnishing the only indication or proof that we have that this country was inhabited for hundreds of years before the white man came here, In 1918 Cameron sought an appropriation to purchase the land, and again in 1919. Then in 1921 Cameron reported to Parliament that a gentleman in Melbourne [offered] 300 pounds towards the purchase of that land as a reserve. He wished it to be handed over to the State or to some organisation. However, Cameron fell seriously ill shortly after and died in December 1923, so that no further action was taken.

In 1969, the landowner, a Mr Powell, became concerned about damage to the site, and offered to sell a portion of CA 24 to the Shire of Romsey. The Shire obtained financial support from the Victorian government in 1971 and the title was transferred in 1972. In 1976, an archaeological area was declared under the Archaeological and Aboriginal Relics Preservation Act 1972 over the council-owned land and the adjoining privately owned CA 16A to the north.

In 1997 the Shire of Romsey (now Macedon Ranges Shire Council) gifted their land to the Indigenous Land Corporation, which subsequently put the site under the management of the Wurundjeri Woi Wurrung Cultural Heritage Aboriginal Corporation, It has also been included on the Register of the National Estate and the Australian National Heritage List.

On October 23, 2012 ownership of the site was officially returned to the Wurundjeri Woi Wurrung Cultural Heritage Aboriginal Corporation.

== Geographical location ==
- Mount William 37.210516°S 144.810297°E
- Mount William south west37.213447°S 144.808731°E
- Mount William north east37.210935°S 144.812486°E

.

== See also ==
- Langdale axe industry
- Wurundjeri
