= Simon Wonga =

Aboriginal elder in pre-colonial Australia (1824–1874)

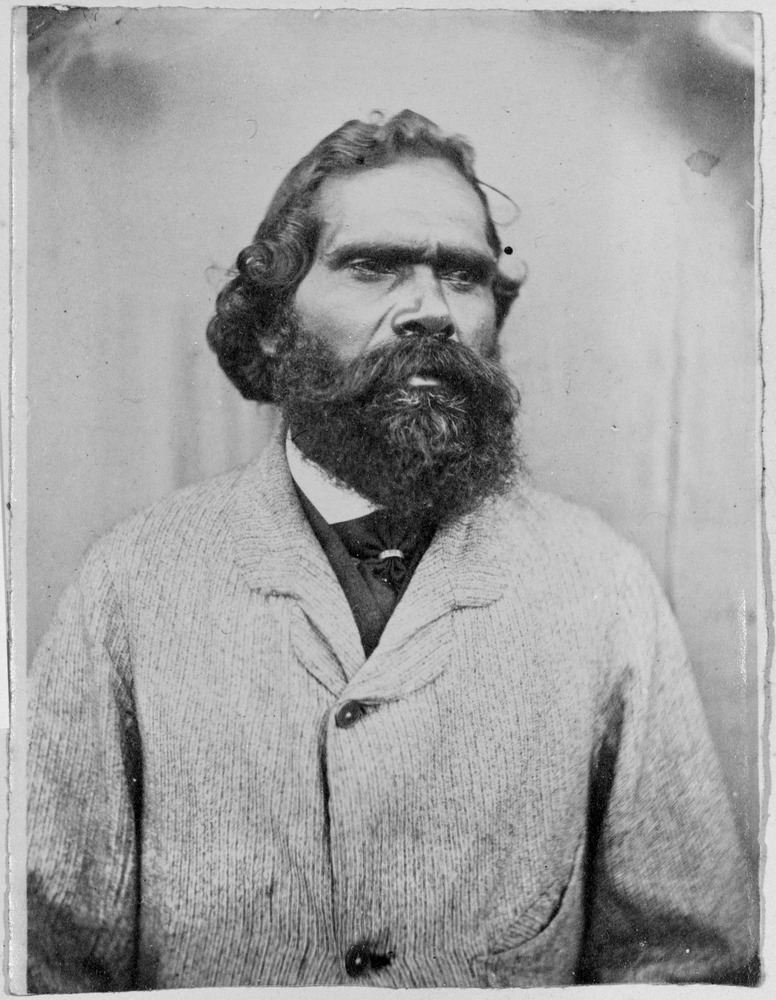
- Portrait by Carl Walter, 1866
- Born: c. 1824
- Died: 1874

Simon Wonga (c. 1824–1874), ngurungaeta and son of Billibellary, was an elder of the Wurundjeri people, who lived in the Melbourne area of Australia before European settlement. He was resolute that his people would survive the "onslaught" of white men.

== Life ==
In 1835, he was present when his father and other Wurundjeri elders met with John Batman and witnessed the signing of the historically contentious "treaty" which heralded the establishment of a permanent British colony in Victoria.

In 1840 Wonga injured his foot in the Dandenongs. Billibellary searched for him, and when found carried him to a homestead where he was transported back to Melbourne by dray to be cared for and have his wound dressed for a period of two months by Assistant Protector William Thomas and wife Susannah.

His father died in 1846 and by 1851 he was recognised leader, the ngurungaeta or headman of the Wurundjeri and Kulin people.

By 1848 he had joined the Native Police Corp and led armed and mounted units conducting licence hunts with Captain Dana during the early years of Victoria's gold rush. After the Corps were disbanded in 1853, he worked with Colonel Joseph Anderson, Joseph Panton, Alfred Selwyn, Robert Brough Smyth, and as an occasional guide for landscape painters Eugene Von Guerard, Nicholas Chevalier and later with Louis Buvelot. He was a regular guest of Lilly and Paul de Castella at Yering Station while his family took refuge upstream on the Yarra River around Woori Yallock-Launching Place. A reserve was gazetted for that site until a gold rush to Hoddles Creek in 1858.

In February 1859 some Wurundjeri elders, led by Wonga (aged 35) and brother Tommy Munnering (aged 24) petitioned Protector Thomas to secure land for the Taungurong at the junction of the Acheron and Goulburn rivers. "I bring my friends Goulburn Blacks, they want a block of land in their country where they may sit down plant corn potatoes etc etc, and work like white man", he told Thomas.

Initial representations to the Victorian Government were positive, however the intervention of the most powerful squatter in Victoria, Hugh Glass, resulted in their removal to a colder site, Mohican Station, which was not suitable for agricultural land and had to be abandoned. Finally in March 1863 the Kulin people suggested a traditional camping site located at Coranderrk, near Healesville and requested ownership of this land. This meeting occurred at the State Exhibition buildings during celebrations for the marriage of the Prince of Wales, and was sketched by Nicholas Chevalier and published in national newspapers. Access to the land was provided, though importantly not granted as freehold.

He was a successful entrepreneur, described by Fred Cahir in Black Gold (2013) trading building materials, baskets and meats and labour with farmers and miners.

== Personal life and death ==
Simon Wonga appears to have been married three times, twice to Gunai Kurnai women, and it is believed that none of his children survived. On 19 July 1865 The Argus reported on an inquest into the death of "Captain Tom" the "son of Wonga" who had died of lung and heart disease after prolonged morbidity near Bendigo. The report included his young widow named "Eliza" related to the "Goulburn tribe".

The cause of Wonga's death in 1874 is usually accepted as tuberculosis.

William Barak was his cousin, who took over as ngurungaeta after his death.

== Legacy ==
The Melbourne suburb of Wonga Park is named after him. He provided the name Donna Buang to Joseph Panton for a mountain in the upper Yarra, and Wonga Road in Millgrove was named in his honour. Mount Wonga in Gippsland is also named after him, an area that was unsuccessfully mined for gold in the 1920s. A Wonga Wonga Society devoted to the preservation of the environment was briefly formed by a small group of people in Gippsland at the beginning of the 20th century.
