= Jika Jika =

Jika Jika may refer to places in Victoria, Australia:

- Another name of Billibellary
- A unit of HM Prison Pentridge
- Electoral district of Jika Jika
- Jika Jika Province, an electoral district
- the Shire of Jika Jika, a former name of the City of Preston (Victoria)
