= Anne Fraser Bon =

Scottish-born Australian pastoralist, philanthropist and advocate

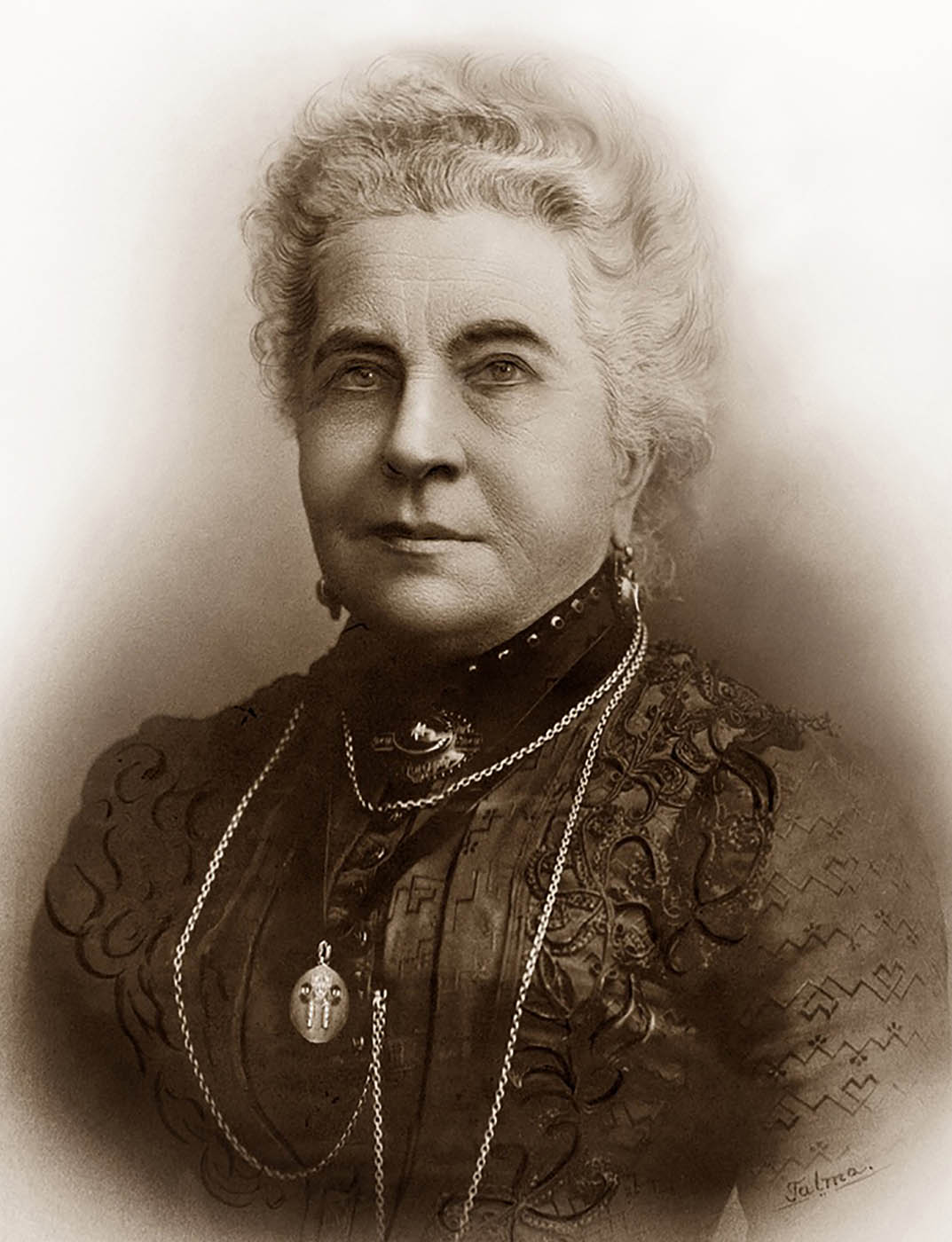
- Anne Fraser Bon, 1904
- Born: Anne Fraser Dougall; 9 April 1838; Perthshire, Scotland
- Died: 5 June 1936 (aged 98); Melbourne, Victoria, Australia
- Occupations: pastoralist, philanthropist
- Known for: advocate for Aboriginal people

Anne Fraser Bon (9 April 1838 – 5 June 1936) was a Scottish-born Australian pastoralist, philanthropist and advocate for Aboriginal people.

== Life ==
Bon was born in Perthshire, Scotland and was the second daughter of Jane (born Fraser) and physician David Dougall. In 1858, she married a friend of the Dougall family named John Bon, and they moved to Victoria where John had established himself.

She was active in advocating for marginalised persons in Victoria, including the Chinese, blind soldiers and inmates of State mental institutions. She campaigned for a public inquiry into the treatment of Victoria's Aboriginal people, which led to the 1881 Coranderrk Inquiry to which she was an appointed member. Bon was later appointed to Victoria's Aboriginal Protection Board. In 1934 she presented the stone used for the monument in Healesville to William Barak, with whom she had a long association.

Bon died on 5 June 1936 in Melbourne.
