= Wurundjeri =

Indigenous Australian people of the Melbourne area

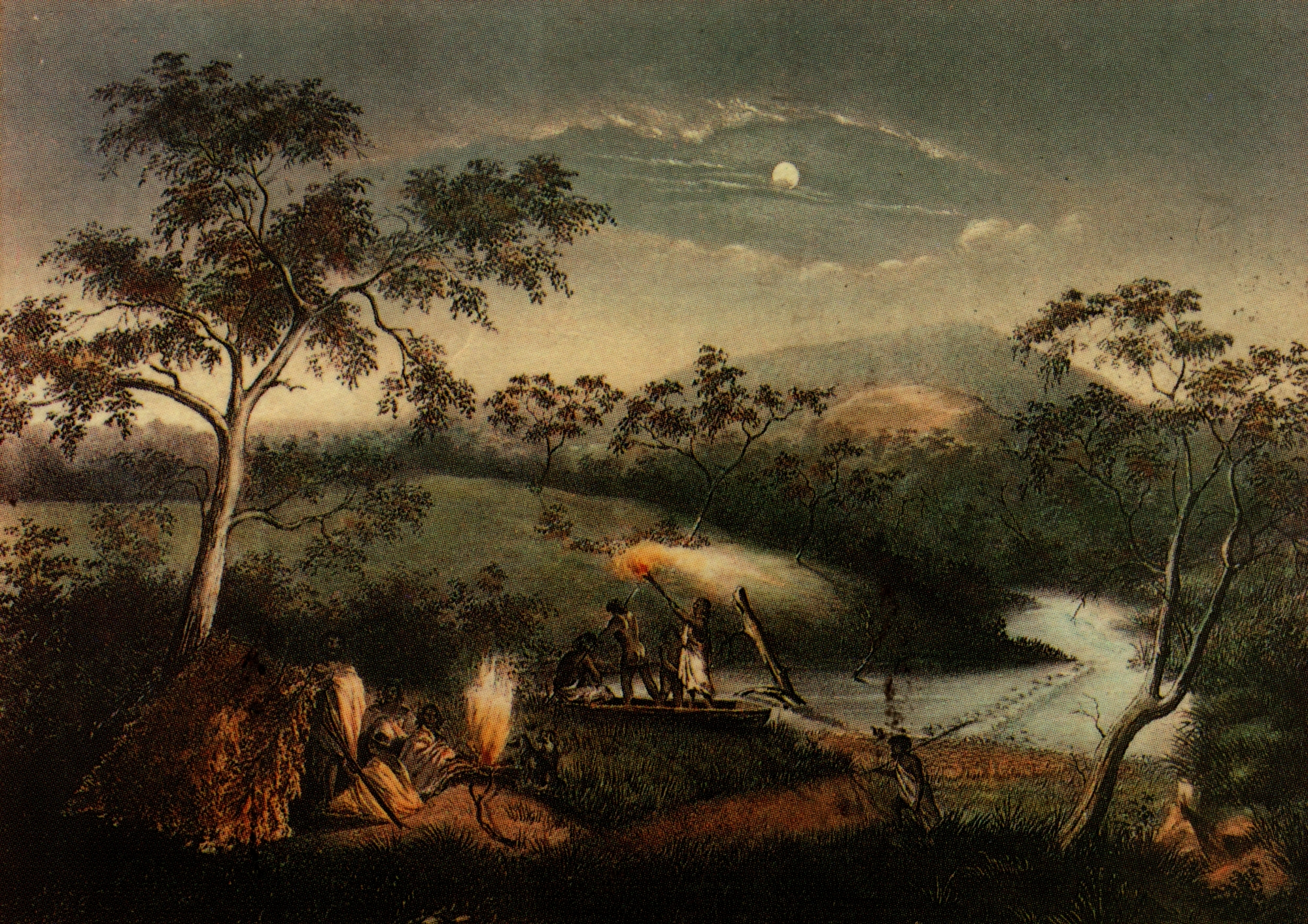
- Aboriginals at Merri Creek by Charles Troedel, 1864

Languages
- Woiwurrung, Australian English

Religion
- Aboriginal mythology, Christianity

Related ethnic groups
- Boonwurrung, Dja Dja Wurrung, Taungurung, Wathaurong

The Wurundjeri people are an Aboriginal people of the Woiwurrung language group, in the Kulin nation. Together with the Boonwurrung people they are the traditional owners of the Yarra River Valley, covering much of the present location of Melbourne, or, in their language, Naarm. (Note: Narn was a hill just north of Melbourne considered highly dangerous, and to be avoided. It was believed to be the place where a creature with a human form, Wiwonderrer, but hard as stone preyed on intruders.) They continue to live in this area and throughout Australia. They were called the Yarra tribe by early European colonists.

The Wurundjeri Woi Wurrung Cultural Heritage Aboriginal Corporation was established in 1985 by people of Wurundjeri descent.

== Ethnonym ==
According to the early Australian ethnographer Alfred William Howitt, the name Wurundjeri is composed to wurun, referring to a species of eucalypt, Eucalyptus viminalis, otherwise known as the manna or white gum common along the Yarra River, and jerri, a variety of grub found in the tree,. Nowadays, Wurundjeri take their ethnonym as meaning "Witchetty Grub People". The morpheme transcribed as 'jerri/'djeri' however might simply reflect rather the plural marker djirra. Barry Blake faulted Howitt's identification, and suggested that the eucalypt in question was the black peppermint. (Note: Editor's note. The black peppermint is native to Tasmania, as opposed to the manna or white gum (Eucalyptus viminalis) which is found along the Yarra.) Ian Clark translates the term to mean 'white gum tree people'.

== Language ==
Wurundjeri people spoke a variety of Woiwurrung, an eastern Kulin dialect.

== Country ==
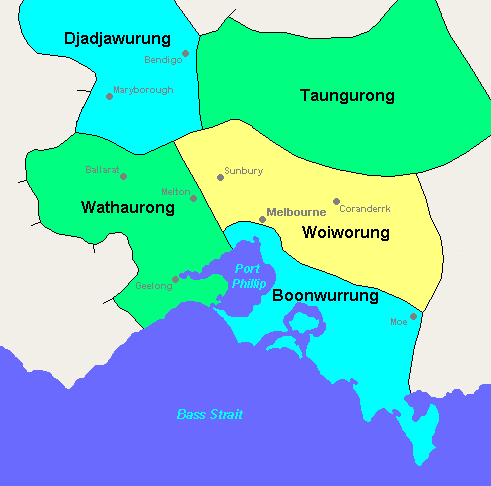
Basic territorial boundaries with other nations

In anthropologist Norman Tindale's estimation – and his data, drawing on anthropologist R. H. Mathews's data which has been challenged – Wurundjeri Country (biik) extended over approximately 12,500 km^{2} (4,800 mi^{2}). These took in the areas of the Yarra and Saltwater rivers around Melbourne, and ran north as far as Mount Disappointment, northwest to Macedon, Woodend, and Lancefield. Their eastern borders went as far as Mount Baw Baw and Healesville. Their southern confines approached Mordialloc, Warragul, and Moe.

In June 2021, the boundaries between the land of two of the traditional owner groups in greater Melbourne, the Wurundjeri and Boonwurrung (Bunurong), were agreed between the two groups, after being drawn up by the Victorian Aboriginal Heritage Council. The new borderline runs across the city from west to east, with the CBD, Richmond and Hawthorn included in Wurundjeri land, and Albert Park, St Kilda and Caulfield on Boonwurrung land. It was agreed that Mount Cottrell would be jointly managed above the 160 m (520 ft) line. The two Registered Aboriginal Parties representing the two groups were the Bunurong Land Council Aboriginal Corporation and the Wurundjeri Woi Wurrung Cultural Heritage Aboriginal Corporation. However, these borders are still in dispute among several prominent figures and Wurundjeri territory has been claimed to spread much further west and south.

== Cosmology and beliefs ==
The idea, widely attested in indigenous traditions, that a skyworld, in many ways a replica of the earth, is inhabited both by the creator spirit(s) who shaped the land, and also by the souls of the dead. For the Wurundjeri this sky realm was known as Tharangalk-bek, namely 'gumtree/manna gum country' It is here that Bunjil, usually called mami-ngata (Our Father), dwells. It was Bunjil who created the landscape of earth (beek-narreen). He fashioned men from clay, while his brother, the bat Pallina, secured wives for them by fishing them out of the water.

Among the Kulin tribes Bunjil, aside from representing the eagle-hawk, is also identified as Altair. (Note: This is the Kulin identification, though it has been suggested that the creator figure, as widespread elsewhere in Victoria, was Fomalhaut.) He is imagined as the celestial headman (ngurungaeta) of the tribe, who after his earthly life, went to dwell in the other land, which, like the Ngamat, is accessible to souls (murup) (Note: The murup is both the soul of the living and the ghost of the dead, and may leave the body during sleep (yamun), the moment of departure being signalled by snoring (yamun-urra). This moment was favoured by wurundjeri medicine men, according to a belief, for extracting fat from a sleeping victim (burrung). The murup of the sleeper may visit the dead and converse with them by a climbing a cord that leads up to a hole in the sky (ngamat), the one the setting sun disappears through.) by the bridging pathways of the setting sun's rays (karalk). (Note: 'Karalk is the bright colour of sunset, and is said to be caused by spirits of the dead going in and out of Ngamat, which is the receptacle of the sun just beyond the edge of the earth.') Bunjil had two wives, Ganaivarra, a black swan, and his son Binbeal, the rainbow. It was he who established the exogamous kinship system . He finally ascended to the sky after ordering Bellin-bellin, the Musk-crow, to release a whirlwind out of his skinbag, which swept Bunjil and his sons aloft. (Note: In a variant, it was Waa who in a fit of anger released the winds that swept Bunjil and his kind skywards.) The Pleiades were created in a similar manner: ants which a group of women (Karat-goruk) (Note: karat means 'group' and gorup is a feminine marker) had dug up with yam-sticks, tipped with burning coal, were stolen by Waang, the Crow. Bunjil had Bellin-bellin open her windsbag, and the Karat-goruk with their brightly burning yamsticks, once gusted up into the sky, became the Pleiades.

In Wurundjeri dreamtime legends, much of the physical landscape resonated with stories of the time associated with Bunjil's creation.There was a 120 foot deep cavernous hollow lying some two miles east of Brushy Creek/Narneian, between it and Running Creek, (Note: Gnurt-bille-worrun in the wurundjeri dialect.) which was called bukkertillibe, the 'bottomless pit'. This was said to have been created when the sky-god Bunjil, outraged by bad people, had a star fall on them, killing many and leaving a gaping hole. The site, now destroyed, is identified as the David Mitchell Ltd. quarry at Cave Hill in Lilydale.

== Initiation ==
At a youth's coming of age initiation ceremony (Jiba-gop, pronounced Jibauk, also refers to the initiate himself), a 10-11 year old Wurundjeri boy, as his whiskers began to grow, was hooded with a rug and then taken to an enclosure some two to three hundreds yards from the main encampment (wilam ) by his guritch, (sister's husband) or kangun (maternal uncle). This area was fenced off by a screen of intrerwoven boughs. Naked until that age, he was then bequeathed one or more kilts (branjep) ) His head was close-shaven, leaving all but a crested ridge of hair, and, together with his shoulders, bedaubed with mud, while his face was smeared ear to ear with pipeclay, as was his trunk from his kilted waist to the back of his head. He kept a plucked possum he had captured in a woven bag, never leaving the jibbauk stockade without it and a firestick. He was allowed to beg for scraps of food accompanied by his guritch around the main camp, and taught what foods were forbidden him (emu, black duck, musk duck, flying tuan, iguana and the spiny ant-eater (echidna). Once his hair had grown back two inches, he was given a possum rug, and reintroduced to the camp where for several days his manhood was celebrated in dance and song. He was then supervised by a wirrarap and gradually allowed to partake of the forbidden foods, concluding with a right to eat emu at around 30–35 years of age, when fat was rubbed into his back to signal he now had permission.

== Seasons ==
The Wurundjeri shared the general Woiworrung division of the year into seven seasons:

- Biderap, the dry season from January to February
- Iuk, eel season covering March
- Waring, the wombat season extending from April to July
- Guling, the season of orchids, in August
- Poorneet, the tadpole season of September–October
- Buarth Gurru, the season of grass flowering in November
- Garrawang, the kangaroo apple season in December.

== Clans ==
The Wurundjeri balug (Note: balug/balluk was a suffix indicating a 'people' defined by the noun it is attached to.) was composed of two patrilines who resided in distinct localities. These were respectively the Wurundjeri-willam and the Bulug-willam, (Note: Clark and Heydon correcting Barwick 1984) where willam means "camping ground"/dwelling, (Note: It also meant 'bark'.) or dwellers.

The Wurundjeri-willam were divided into three sub-groups known by their headsman's name: (1) Bebejan's mob (Note: In the Australian acceptance of this term, a 'mob' is an indigenous family or clan group.)(2) Billibellary's mob, and (3) Jakka-jakka (Note: Sources often refer to him as Jacky Jacky. 'Jackie' was often an impersonal, generic coloniser's name for any indigenous person, a derisory nickname. A Wurundjeri ngurungaeta (d.ca.1851), and Billibellary's oldest brother, the proper pronunciation of his name was ascertained by Howitt.) (Borrunupton)'s mob., each respectively holding different stretches of Wurundjeri territory. Bebejan's mob resided from around the Merri creek-Yarra river junction up to Mount Baw Baw; Billibellary's mob held sway over the area from the Maribyrnong River north to Mount William ; Borrunupton's mob resided in the territory south of the Yarra from Gardiners Creek through to the northern slopes of the Dandenongs (Note: Howitt distinguished (1) Jakka-jakka's mob (2) a Kurnaje-berreing group, subdivided into Bebejan and Billibellary's mobs and (3) a Boi-berrit mob, under their headman Bungerim, centered in Sunbury, all generally living west of the Saltwater River to the western end of Mount Macedon.)

The Bulug-willam' ('swamp dwellers')s territory covered the area south from Mount Baw Baw to Dandenong and the swampland at the head of Western Port bay.

All the Kulin peoples belonged to one of two exogamous moieties (Note: 'It may be laid down as a general proposition that all Australian tribes are divided into two moieties, which intermarry with each other, and each of which is forbidden to marry within itself.') of descent through the male line. These were respectively the Bunjil (Wedge-tailed eagle) and the Waa/Waang (Crow). In the two Wurundjeri classes the Bunjil moiety had a small hawk as totem, while the Waa(ng) lacked any such tutelary animal spirit. The two moieties were separated territorially. (Note: Earlier, in 1889, Howitt had written that all three Wurundjeri clans were classed in the Waa moiety. In 1904 he lists the wurunjerri balug, bulug willam (Cranbourne) and the ngaruk willam (south Dandenong ranges) as all Waang.)

== History ==
=== Pre-colonisation ===
The pre-colonial population of what is now known as the state of Victoria has been estimated as approximately 11,500 to 15,000 Aboriginal people, composed of some 38 tribal groups. The Wurundjeri population probably fluctuated around 400 individuals. Archaeological evidence from the Melbourne region has shown human habitation in the area dating back to 31,000 years before present. As was attested by early colonial observers like George Robinson and William Thomas (Note: Howitt in 1904 wrote:'He had great opportunities for obtaining information, for, as he says, he was " out with them for months," but it is much to be regretted that he did not place on record the very many facts which he must have seen as to their beliefs and customs, which would have been invaluable now.' Thomas actually did take down extensive notes during his work with native informants like Jaga Jaga, but all of his papers down to 1845 were stolen.) in the first decade of colonization, the Melbourne area still figured prominently as one of the places where upwards of 800 men, women and children from all the Kulin groups would assemble for ceremonial rites, (Note: A corroboree was ngarrga (to dance) in Wurundjeri.) trading, marriage-making and dispute settlements. (Note: Richard Howitt describes a ritual battle and a corroboree of reconciliation over two nights, in which 300 natives participated before roughly a thousand settlers.)

The practice of firestick farming resulted in large areas of grassy plains extending inland from Melbourne, to the north and southwest, with little forest cover, providing pasture to expose the massive number of yam daisies (murnong) which proliferated in the area. (Note: 'The practice, which secured ample food for native peoples in the larger Melbourne area, was sharply criticized by settlers who complained of the loss of grasslands for their livestock's grazing.':'Kulin economy required undisturbed possession of large tracts of land; so did the European pastoralists. Violent encounters occurred all over the colony when pastoralists drove the owning clans from the sources of food and water which had been their undisputed possession for thousands of years.':'Sheep, horses, and cattle were indeed the foot soldiers of the European invasion of colonisation led on horseback by explorers and followed up by squatters with the result that . ."The yam daisy . . has become locally scarce since the country was transformed into a rural landscape'. More precisely, Aboriginal country was transformed from their agricultural, aquacultural, pastoral and paludicultural drylands and wetlands with cultivated native plants and animals and managed fire into a European-style pastoral and rural landscape with introduced plants and animals) These roots and various tuber lilies formed a major source of starch and carbohydrates. Seasonal changes in the weather, availability of foods and other factors would determine where campsites were located, many being along the Yarra River (Birrarung) and its tributaries. Bolin Bolin lagoon was a particularly important habitation, ceremonial and food resource site, where eels, fish and possum were procured.

The Wurundjeri-willam and Bulug-willam clans mined diorite at Mount William stone axe quarry which was a source for the highly valued greenstone hatchet heads, which were traded across a wide area as far as New South Wales and Adelaide. The mine provided a complex network of trading for economic and social exchange among the different Aboriginal nations in Victoria. The quarry had been in use for more than 1,500 years and covered 18 hectares including underground pits of several metres. In February 2008 the site was placed on the Australian National Heritage List for its cultural importance and archeological value.

=== Onset of British colonisation ===
In 1835, the Port Phillip Association of colonists from Van Diemen's Land, represented by John Batman, arrived on Wurundjeri Country with a view to purchasing a large tract of grazing land. The Wurundjeri had the impression that they were ngamajet, or red-faced sunset spirits (murup) returning from the land of the dead. (Note: 'ngamat was the place where the sun goes down and the sky, the sunset, was where a dead man’s murup or spirit went: ‘when he comes back he is Ngamajet'.') At Merri Creek, Batman met with eight leading men (ngurungaeta) of the local clans, including Bebejan, Billibellary and Jakka-jakka (Jaga Jaga/Borrunuptun) of the Wurundjeri. They signed Batman's Treaty, after participating in a tanderrum ceremony, allowing the colonists temporary residence on their land. However, even though the treaty was later annulled, Batman and the Port Phillip Association used the agreement to appropriate 600,000 acres of land for an annual payment of flour, trinkets and clothing.

Within a few years other arriving British colonists had expropriated most of the traditional Wurundjeri land along the Yarra River and its tributaries, forcing them away from many sites that they depended on for food, water, shelter and ceremony. (Note: Within 6 years (1841), the influx of almost 12,000 Europeans led to the expropriation of nearly all Kulin estates. By the time Victoria became an independent colony, in 1851, over 70,000 settlers, close to 400,000 cattle and 6.6 million sheep had displaced the Wurundjeri and other Kulin groups from their lands. Within 26 years, by 1861, only 2,000 of the estimated original Victorian indigenous population had survived the decimation caused by 'wanton slaughter', starvation, and introduced diseases such as influenza, measles, tuberculosis, syphilis and gonorrhea)

=== Effects of colonisation ===
With limited options, many Wurundjeri people initially found that residing close to the emerging British settlement at Melbourne, provided some security from hunger and settler violence. The south bank of the Yarra across from the settlement and the adjacent Tromgin swamps to the east became an important place of indigenous habitation. In 1836, the combined Woiwurrung and Boonwurrung population in the Melbournian area was estimated at 350. In the 1839 census conducted by William Thomas 207 were listed. By 1852 a mere 59 remained, and the figure fell to 22 Woiwurrung and 11 Boonwurrung by 1863. Despite their desire to settle, the local aborigines were forced to be constantly on the move: they were denied entry into fenced paddocks to forage, and the governor forbade the dealing out of adequate food rations to enable them to stay at any one place. The only options left were begging or doing menial jobs (Note: Richard Howitt, within 10 years of settlement described the disenfranchised Wurundjeri as Gibeonites, the biblical 'hewers of wood and drawers of water' for the 'white strangers') like gathering bark and firewood for the new occupiers of their land.

==== The Langhorne mission ====
In 1837, Governor Bourke approved a reserve, at what is now the Royal Botanic Gardens, for an Aboriginal mission to 'civilise' the local clans. Under the authority of Reverend George Langhorne, around 80 Indigenous people, most of whom were Wurundjeri, stayed at the site. A small school was established at which around 18 Aboriginal children attended.

A few months after the establishment of Langhorne's mission, the police magistrate William Lonsdale accused some of the attending Indigenous men of stealing potatoes from a nearby farm. A young Wurundjeri man named Tullamareena was violently arrested and jailed. He subsequently escaped after burning down the prison. Lonsdale later returned to the mission with a detachment of New South Wales Mounted Police and dispersed the residents with gun fire. As a result, the mission ceased to operate.

==== Battle of Yering ====
Wurundjeri still continued to camp along the south bank of the Yarra and by 1838 a trade was established whereby the Aboriginal people were selling baskets, possum skins and lyrebird feathers to the settlers. Some settlers gave Wurundjeri men muskets to facilitate their hunting of lyrebirds.

In early 1840, Jaga Jaga used these weapons to organise a raid on a settler's potato farm on the Yarra River. A contingent of Mounted Police and Border Police under Commissioner Henry Fyshe Gisborne was sent to arrest him. Gisborne encountered Jaga Jaga and his 50 armed followers at Yering (Note: the town name, properly Yerrang, means 'scrubby' in Wurundjeri.) where a firefight took place between the two opposing sides. No fatalities were reported and Jaga Jaga was captured but later escaped. This event became known as Jaga Jaga’s Resistance or the Battle of Yering.

==== Expulsion from Melbourne and the Lettsom raid ====
The superintendent of the Port Phillip District, Charles La Trobe, was alarmed at this insurgency and ordered the confiscation of guns from Aborigines and directed the Mounted Police to patrol the outskirts of Melbourne to prevent any "blacks" from entering the town. However, many Aboriginal people continued to use the south bank of the Yarra as a major camping spot. By the middle of 1840, La Trobe was increasingly willing to use force to remove the Aboriginal people from Melbourne, and in September, he issued orders to expel them directing that "no Aboriginal blacks...are to visit the township of Melbourne under any pretext whatever".

On 1 October 1840, Major Samuel Lettsom of the 80th Regiment and his Mounted Police made a raid on the Yarra camp, charging their horses and driving men, women and children into the river and up into the trees to avoid injury. Not long after dispersing the Yarra camp, Lettsom received news that a large group of Taungurung people were coming down from the Goulburn River region to conduct a meeting with the Wurundjeri. This large meeting of around 400 men, women and children began at what is now Yarra Bend Park. In the early hours of Sunday 11 October 1840, Major Lettsom with soldiers of the 28th Regiment under Captain George Brunswick Smyth, troopers of the NSW Mounted Police under Lieutenant Russell and Border Police troopers under Frederick Powlett, surrounded the large group while they slept. They then surprised the gathering and arrested and chained almost the entire group, with only a few escaping. Several people were wounded during the arrest and a Taungurung leader named Winberri was shot dead in what became known as the Lettsom Raid.

The remaining 300 to 400 Aboriginal people were marched down Heidelberg Road and into Melbourne. The women, children and old men who lagged behind were forced to keep moving by being pricked with bayonets and clubbed with rifle butts. Numerous injuries were recorded. They were herded down Collins Street and corralled into a yard. Rolf Boldrewood described the scene as

a whole tribe of blacks — wondering and frightened, young and old, warriors and greybeards, women and children — is being driven along Collins Street by troopers, on their way to the temporary gaol, there to be incarcerated for real or fancied violence.

Those identified as Wurundjeri, Woiwurrung or Boonwurrung were allowed to leave, but around 35 Taungurung men and boys remained imprisoned and chained together. That night some of the Taungurung attempted to escape from the warehouse. The soldiers guarding the warehouse discovered the attempt and shot dead a man and wounded another. Nine Taungurung were eventually sentenced to 10 years transportation and four of these were shot dead trying to escape.

After the Lettsom raid, the Wurundjeri were compelled to live at the designated reserves at Nerre Nerre Warren and Merri Creek away from Melbourne. However, for several years they continued to exercise their mobility and did not cease to visit Melbourne, despite the real possibility of further military intervention. Six years after the raid, La Trobe still found himself ordering Kulin camps to be burnt to force them out from the settlement.

==== Protectorate stations at Nerre Nerre Warren and Merri Creek ====
Concern from several politicians in London about the devastating effect British colonialism was having on Australian Aborigines, resulted in the establishment of a system of Protector of Aborigines. In 1839, George Augustus Robinson and an assistant William Thomas arrived in Melbourne as Protectors for the Aboriginal people of Melbourne.

La Trobe and the Protectors agreed in 1840 to establish an Aboriginal reserve at Nerre Nerre Warren as it was well outside Melbourne. However, most Wurundjeri refused to go there as food and water were scarce. In 1842, the Merri Creek Protectorate Station was created and most Wurundjeri agreed to reside either there and near to it because food was reliable and it was also a traditional camping spot.

At times, up to 500 Aboriginal people camped at the Merri Creek Protectorate as surviving outside was becoming increasingly difficult with the expansion of British settlement in the region. The Aboriginal Native Police troopers were also barracked nearby, ensuring a regular supply of rations. A school was established there for the children in 1845.

However, by the end of 1847, funding for the Protectorate system had ceased and this together with an influenza outbreak at the camp and the death of Billibellary, resulted in the Wurundjeri abandoning the Merri Creek reserve.

==== Troopers for the Native Police ====
In 1842, La Trobe established a mounted paramilitary force consisting of Aboriginal troopers enlisted from the Melbourne tribes. The purpose of this force, called the Native Police Corps in Victoria, was to provide settlers in the more distant regions a cost-effective militia to counter Aboriginal resistance. According to La Trobe, the troopers would not only be the "equals in savage cunning" of the Indigenous insurgents but be "their superiors" by being armed with guns, swords and military training.

Faced with the option of a precarious life of famine and misery in either illegal Aboriginal camps or underfunded reserves, some leading Wurundjeri chose to join the Native Police, which provided regular pay, rations, clothing and housing for both themselves and their families. The ability to possess guns and horses also gave them an empowering status otherwise unattainable for Aboriginal men in the European world.

Of the first intake of 22 men in 1842, around five were Wurundjeri, including the head of the clan, Billibellary. While he was hesitant to join and refused to go on duty outside Melbourne, he saw the advantages to the survival of his people in enlisting. Over the ten year history of the Port Phillip Native Police, around 17 Wurundjeri men, including William Barak, joined the force, doing various tours of duty around what became the state of Victoria. Several Wurundjeri boys were forcibly recruited from the Merri Creek Aboriginal school. The force were involved in several massacres of Aboriginal people, and some troopers were later deployed as police on the Victorian gold-fields.

By the end of 1852, Aboriginal resistance in Victoria had been quashed and La Trobe disbanded the force, with most of the troopers having already died from violence or disease. The remnant Wurundjeri, amounting to only 39 people, were left to eke out an existence in the bush around Melbourne. Around a quarter of their remaining population died in 1852 alone.

=== Coranderrk ===
For two decades, from 1853 down to 1874, the ngurungaeta of the Yarra River area's clans began to encourage the surviving remnants of the Kulin tribes to rebuild a home for themselves collectively at Coranderrk. On 30 June 1863 the surviving members of the Wurundjeri were allowed a "permissive occupancy" of Coranderrk Station, near Healesville with 2,300 acres (931 ha) set aside as a reservation for their use, shortly after a deputation consisting of the headmen Simon Wonga and William Barak, two Woiwurrung and two Boonwurrung clan members, a number of men and boys from various Taungurong clans and a Pangerang representative had petitioned the Governor of Victoria Sir Henry Barkly about their need for land. Despite numerous petitions, letters, and delegations to the Colonial and Federal Government, the grant of this land in compensation for the country lost was refused. Despite the success of its hops farming, the passing of the 1886 Aboriginal Protection Act, otherwise known as the half-caste act, in banning aboriginals of 35 and under from reserves effectively denied it the chance to replenish its work fore, triggering its slow decline. Coranderrk was closed in 1924 and the 'coloured folk' camping outside the reserve on the 80 acre (32 ha) block nearby, were again moved to Lake Tyers in Gippsland. Five families living within the reserve were allowed to remain in their cottages. (Note: 'On 5 December 1923, the Board resolved that Annie and Lanky Manton, Mrs Dunolly, Alfred Davis and his family and William Russell might remain in their cottages. These nine were allowed the use of 50 acres (20 ha) which the next Board minutes described as ‘poor land and not required’.')

== Wurundjeri today ==
All remaining Wurundjeri people are descendants of Bebejan, through his daughter Annie Borate (Boorat), and in turn, her son Robert Wandin (Wandoon). Bebejan was a Ngurungaeta of the Wurundjeri people and was present at John Batman's "treaty" signing in 1835. Joy Murphy Wandin, a Wurundjeri elder, explains the importance of preserving Wurundjeri culture:

In the recent past, Wurundjeri culture was undermined by people being forbidden to "talk culture" and language. Another loss was the loss of children taken from families. Now, some knowledge of the past must be found and collected from documents. By finding and doing this, Wurundjeri will bring their past to the present and recreate a place of belonging. A "keeping place" should be to keep things for future generations of our people, not a showcase for all, not a resource to earn dollars. I work towards maintaining the Wurundjeri culture for Wurundjeri people into the future. (Note: Joy Murphy Wandin quoted in Ellender & Christiansen 2001, p. 121)

In 1985, the Wurundjeri Woi Wurrung Cultural Heritage Aboriginal Corporation was established to fulfil statutory roles under Commonwealth and Victorian legislation and to assist in raising awareness of Wurundjeri culture and history within the wider community.

Wurundjeri elders often attend events with visitors present where they give the traditional welcome to country greeting in the Woiwurrung language:

Wominjeka yearmenn koondee-bik Wurundjeri-Ballak

which means "Welcome to the land of the Wurundjeri people".

== Notable people ==
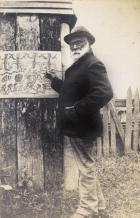
William Barak at Coranderrk

Ngurungaeta:

- Bebejan (?-1836): ngurungaeta, and William Barak's father and Billibellary's brother
- Billibellary (1799–1846): ngurungaeta of the Wurundjeri-willam clan
- Simon Wonga (1824–1874): ngurungaeta by 1851 until his death; Billibellary's son
- William Barak (1824–1903): ngurungaeta of the Wurundjeri-willam clan from 1874 until his death
- James Wandin (1933–2006): ngurungaeta until his death, and an Australian rules footballer
- Murrundindi: ngurungaeta from 2006 until present

Other notable Wurundjeri people include:

- Tullamareena: imprisoned by the British and escaped after burning down Melbourne's first jail. His name may be connected to Tullamarine.
- Diane Kerr: elder
- Winnie Quagliotti (1931–1988): elder
- Joy Murphy Wandin: senior elder

== Alternative names/spellings ==
- Coraloon (?)
- Gungung-willam
- Kukuruk (northern clan name)
- Mort Noular (language name)
- Ngarukwillam
- N'uther Galla
- Nuthergalla (ngatha = juða "no" in the Melbourne dialect)
- Oorongie
- Urunjeri
- Waarengbadawa
- Wainworra
- Wairwaioo
- Warerong
- Warorong
- Warwaroo
- Wavoorong
- Wawoorong, Wawoorong
- Wawurong
- Wawurrong
- Woeworung
- Woiworung (name for the language they spoke, from woi + worung = speech)
- Woiwurru (woi = no + wur:u = lip)
- Woiwurung, Woiwurong, Woiwurrong
- Wooeewoorong
- Wowerong
- Wurrundyirra-baluk
- Wurunjeri
- Wurunjerri
- Wurunjerri-baluk
- Yarra Yarra
- Yarra Yarra Coolies (kulin = man)

== Some words ==
- gurrborra (koala)
- wirrarap (medicine man)
- mainmeet (outsiders, foreigners)
- dhanguth/dhangidj(food cf.dhanga, 'to eat ')
- burndap (good)
- nyilam (bad)

== See also ==
- Indigenous Australians
- Australian Aboriginal enumeration
- Battle of Yering
- Possum-skin cloak
- Gunai people

== Sources ==
- "The Abbotsford Convent Muse, Issue 18" (PDF). September 2007. Archived from the original (PDF) on 30 September 2009.
- "AIATSIS map of Indigenous Australia". AIATSIS. 18 June 2021.
- "Ancestors & Past". Wurundjeri Tribe Council.
- Barwick, Diane E. (1984). McBryde, Isabel (ed.). "Mapping the past: an atlas of Victorian clans 1835–1904". Aboriginal History. 8 (2): 100–131. JSTOR 24045800.
- Barwick, Diane E. (2024). Barwick, Laura E.; Barwick, Richard E. (eds.). Rebellion at Coranderrk (PDF). Australian National University Press. ISBN 978-1-760-46650-3.
- "Batmania: The Deed, National Museum of Australia". Archived from the original on 16 October 2013.
- Blake, Barry J. (1992). "The Aboriginal Language of Melbourne and Other Sketches". In Dixon, Robert M. W.; Blake, Barry (eds.). The Handbook of Australian Languages. Vol. 4. Oxford University Press Australia. pp. 31–124. ISBN 978-0-195-53097-1.
- Boldrewood, Rolf (1896). Old Melbourne Memories. MacMillan.
- Boyce, James (2011). 1835: The founding of Melbourne and the conquest of Australia. Collingwood: Black Inc. ISBN 978-1-760-64480-2.
- Bride, Thomas (1898). Letters from Victorian Pioneers. Melbourne: Government Printer.
- Broome, Richard (2005). Aboriginal Victorians: A History Since 1800. Allen & Unwin. ISBN 978-1-741-14569-4.
- Brown, Peter. "The Keilor Cranium". Peter Brown's Australian and Asian Palaeoanthropology. Archived from the original on 15 November 2011.
- Cannon, Michael (1993). Black Land, White Land. Port Melbourne: Minerva. ISBN 978-1-863-30315-6.
- Clark, Ian; Heydon, Toby (2004). A Bend in the Yarra: A History of the Merri Creek Protectorate Station. Aboriginal Studies Press. ISBN 978-0-855-75469-3.
- Clark, Ian D. (1 December 2005). ""You have all this place, no good have children ..." Derrimut: traitor, saviour, or a man of his people?". Journal of the Royal Australian Historical Society. 91 (2): 107–132.
- Clark, Ian; Kostanski, Laura (2006). An Indigenous History of Stonnington. University of Ballarat.
- Clarke, Philip A. (2007). "An Overview of Australian Aboriginal Ethnoastronomy" (PDF). Archaeoastronomy. XXI: 39–59.
- Clarke, Philip A. (2018). "Totemic life". In Cahir, Fred; Clark, Ian; Clarke, Philip A. (eds.). Aboriginal Biocultural Knowledge in South-eastern Australia:Perspectives of Early Colonists. CSIRO Publishing. pp. 1–18.
- Decision in relation to an Application by Wurundjeri Tribe Land and Compensation Cultural Heritage Council Inc to be a Registered Aboriginal Party. Victorian Aboriginal Heritage Council. 22 August 2008.
- "Domestic Intelligence". Port Phillip Gazette. Vol. III, no. 209. 16 January 1841. p. 3 – via National Library of Australia.
- Dunstan, Joseph (26 June 2021). "Melbourne's birth destroyed Bunurong and Wurundjeri boundaries. 185 years on, they've been redrawn". ABC News.
- Eidelson, Meyer (2000) [First published 1997]. The Melbourne Dreaming: A Guide to the Aboriginal Places of Melbourne. Aboriginal Studies Press.
- Ellender, Isabel; Christiansen, Peter (2001). People of the Merri Merri. The Wurundjeri in Colonial Days. Merri Creek Management Committee. ISBN 978-0-9577728-0-9.
- "Encounter with blacks at port Phillip". Southern Australian. 16 April 1840. p. 8 – via National Library of Australia.
- Fels, Marie (1986). Good Men and True. 1986 PhD Thesis. Archived from the original on 25 August 2017.
- Fels, Marie (2011). 'I Succeeded Once': The Aboriginal Protectorate on the Mornington Peninsula, 1839–1840 (PDF). ANU Press. ISBN 978-1-921-86212-0.
- Flanagan, Martin (25 January 2003). "Tireless ambassador bids you welcome". The Age.
- Flannery, Tim (2002) [First published 1852]. "Introduction". In Morgan, John (ed.). The Life and Adventures of William Buckley. ISBN 978-1-877-00820-7.
- Fleming, James (2002). Currey, John (ed.). A journal of Grimes' survey: the Cumberland in Port Phillip January–February 1803. Banks Society Publications. ISBN 978-0-949586-10-0. cited in Rhodes 2003, p. 24
- Gammage, Bill (2012) [First published 2011]. The biggest estate on earth: how Aborigines made Australia. Allen & Unwin. ISBN 978-1-743-31132-5.
- Gannaway, Kath (24 January 2007). "Important step for reconciliation". Star News Group.
- Gardiner, Aunty Margaret; McGaw, Janet (2018). "'Indigenous Placemaking in Urban Melbourne: A Dialogue Between a Wurundjeri Elder and a Non-Indigenous Architect and Academic". In Grant, Elizabeth; Greenop, Kelly; Refiti, Albert L.; Glenn, Daniel J. (eds.). The Handbook of Contemporary Indigenous Architecture. Springer. pp. 581–605. ISBN 978-9-811-06904-8.
- Giblett, Rod (2023). Middlemarsh: The Hopkins River, Kindred Wetlands and Remarkable People. Transnational Press London. ISBN 978-1-801-35200-0.
- "Governor Bourke's Proclamation 1835 (UK)". National Archives of Australia: I.
- Hamacher, Duane Willis (2011). On the Astronomical Knowledge and Traditions of Aboriginal Australians (PhD thesis). Macquarie University, Sydney, Australia.
- Hinds, Richard (24 May 2002). "Marn Grook, a native game on Sydney's biggest stage". The Age.
- Howitt, Richard (1845). Impressions of Australia Felix (PDF). Longman.
- Howitt, A. W. (1886). "On the Migrations of the Kurnai Ancestors". The Journal of the Anthropological Institute of Great Britain and Ireland. 15: 409–422. JSTOR 2841818.
- Howitt, A. W. (1889). "On the organisation of Australian tribes". Transactions of the Royal Society of Victoria. 1 (2): 96–137 – via BHL.
- Howitt, Alfred William (1904). The native tribes of south-east Australia. Macmillan.
- Hunter, Ian (2004–2005). "Yarra Creation Story". Wurundjeri Dreaming. Archived from the original on 4 November 2008.
- "Indigenous Sporting Heroes: History of the Wurundjeri People". n.d.
- "Interview with Megan Goulding, CEO Wurundjeri Inc" (PDF). Abbotsford Convent Muse. No. 18. September 2007. Archived from the original (PDF) on 30 September 2009.
- "Management of Wurundjeri Properties & Significant Places". Wurundjeri Tribe Council.
- McBryde, Isabel (October 1984). "Kulin Greenstone Quarries: The Social Contexts of Production and Distribution for the Mt William Site". World Archaeology. 16 (2): 267–285. doi:10.1080/00438243.1984.9979932. JSTOR 124577.
- Menzies, Diane; Ormond-Parker, Lyndon; Isaacs, Dee (2024). "Inclusive Australasian Cityscapes". Urban Policy and Research. 42 (4): 355–371.
- "Port Phillip". The Sydney Monitor And Commercial Advertiser . 24 October 1840. p. 2 – via National Library of Australia.
- "National Heritage List: Mount William Stone Hatchet Quarry". Department of the Environment and Energy. Archived from the original on 6 April 2012.
- Nicholson, Bill and Mandy (2016). Wurundjeri's Cultural Heritage of the Melton Area (PDF). Melbourne: Melton City Council.
- Nguyen-Robertson, Catriona (15 May 2025). "The Seven Wurundjeri Seasons". Science Victoria.
- Pascoe, Bruce (2014). Dark emu black seeds: agriculture or accident?. Magabala Books. ISBN 978-1-922-14244-3. OCLC 930855686.
- Polley, Valerie (2023). "Resistance and Outrage". Warrandyte Historical Society.
- "Port Phillip". Australasian Chronicle. 23 January 1841. p. 2 – via National Library of Australia.
- Presland, Gary. "Keilor Archaeological Site". Online Encyclopedia of Melbourne (eMelbourne).
- Presland, Gary (1994). Aboriginal Melbourne. The lost land of the Kulin people. McPhee Gribble. ISBN 978-0-86914-346-9.
- Presland, Gary (1997). The First Residents of Melbourne's Western Region. Harriland Press. ISBN 978-0-646-33150-8.
- Rhodes, David (August 2003). "Channel Deepening Existing Conditions Final Report – Aboriginal Heritage" (PDF). Parsons Brinckerhoff & Port of Melbourne Corporation. Archived from the original (PDF) on 1 October 2009.
- Rowley, C.D. (1970). The Destruction of Aboriginal Society. Penguin Books. p. 60. ISBN 978-0-14-021452-9.
- Smyth, Robert Brough (1878). The Aborigines of Victoria: with notes relating to the habits of the natives of other parts of Australia and Tasmania (PDF). Vol. 1. Melbourne: J. Ferres, gov't printer.
- Smyth, Robert Brough (1878). The Aborigines of Victoria: with notes relating to the habits of the natives of other parts of Australia and Tasmania (PDF). Vol. 2. Melbourne: J. Ferres, gov't printer.
- "Simon Wonga". State Library of Victoria. Archived from the original on 14 June 2009.
- Standfield, Rachel (2011). "'The vacillating manners and sentiments of these people': Mobility, civilisation and dispossession in the work of William Thomas with the Port Phillip Aboriginal Protectorate". Law Text Culture. 15 (9): 162–184.
- Steyne, Hanna (2001). "Investigating the Submerged Landscapes of Port Phillip Bay, Victoria" (PDF). Heritage Victoria. Archived from the original (PDF) on 10 April 2012.
- Thomas, William (1898). Bride, Thomas Francis (ed.). Letters from Victorian Pioneers. Public Library of Victoria – via Internet Archive.
- Thompson, David (27 September 2007). "Aborigines were playing possum". Herald Sun. Archived from the original on 8 April 2008.
- Tindale, Norman Barnett (1974). "Wurundjeri (VIC)". Aboriginal Tribes of Australia: Their Terrain, Environmental Controls, Distribution, Limits, and Proper Names. Australian National University Press. ISBN 978-0-708-10741-6.
- Toscano, Joseph (2008). Lest We Forget. The Tunnerminnerwait and Maulboyheenner Saga. Anarchist Media Institute. ISBN 978-0-9758219-4-7.
- Wandin, James (26 May 2000). "An address to the Parliament of Victoria". Parliament of Victorian. Archived from the original on 29 December 2008.
- Warren, Marilyn (21 April 2011). "Early History of the Victorian Legal System". Monash University. JSTOR community.34616455.
- Web, Carolyn (3 June 2005). "History should have no divide". The Age.
- Wiencke, Shirley W. (1984). When the Wattles Bloom Again: The Life and Times of William Barak, Last Chief of the Yarra Yarra Tribe. S.W. Wiencke. ISBN 978-0-9590549-0-3.
