= William Barak =

19th century Aboriginal Australian leader

- William Barak in 1866
- Born: c. September 1823; Brushy Creek, near present-day Wonga Park Victoria, Australia
- Died: 15 August 1903 (aged 79–80); Coranderrk, Victoria, Australia
- Other name: Beruk

William Barak (c. September 1823 – 15 August 1903), named Beruk by his parents, the "last chief of the Yarra Yarra tribe", was the last traditional ngurungaeta (elder) of the Wurundjeri-willam clan, the pre-colonial inhabitants of present-day Melbourne, Australia. He became an influential spokesman for Aboriginal social justice and an important informant on Wurundjeri cultural lore.

In his later life, Barak painted and drew Wurundjeri ceremonies and carved weapons and tools. He is now considered a significant Aboriginal artist of the nineteenth century.

== Early life and education ==
Barak was born in September 1823 at Brushy Creek, near present-day Wonga Park (named after Barak's cousin Simon Wonga), at the Barngeong Birthing Site, His mother, Tooterrie, came from the Nourailum bulluk at Murchison, Victoria. His father, Bebejan (or Bebejern), was an important member, or ngurunaeta, of the Wurundjeri people. His parents named him Beruk.

Barak was said to have been present as a boy when John Batman met with the tribal elders to purchase the Melbourne area in 1835. Ninggalobin, Poleorong and Billibellary were the leading song makers and principal Wurundjeri leaders in the Melbourne region of the colony of Victoria. European colonisation had caused disruptions to initiation ceremonies. In response these three men gathered at South Yarra in the late 1830s and inducted the young Barak into Aboriginal lore. This entailed formally presenting him with the symbols of manhood: strips of possum skin tied around his biceps; the gombert (reed necklace) around his neck; given his ilbi-jerri, a sharp and narrow bone or nose-peg; and his branjep, the apron worn by men to cover their genitals. At the end of the ceremony Barak presented his uncle, Billibellary, a possum-skin cloak.

Barak attended the government's Yarra Mission School from 1837 to 1839.

When he joined the Native Mounted Police in 1844, he adopted the name "William". He had excellent skills as a tracker, and on one occasion helped to find Ned Kelly and his gang.

== Leader and spokesperson ==
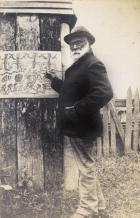
Barak drawing a corroboree

Barak was an influential figure in petitioning for and setting up the Aboriginal farming community known as Coranderrk, near Healesville, Victoria, where he settled in 1863. He attended the mission school and converted to Christianity there.

Upon the death of his cousin Simon Wonga in December 1874, Barak became the Ngurungaeta of the clan. He worked tirelessly for his people and was a successful negotiator on their behalf. He was a highly respected man and leader, with standing amongst the Indigenous people and the European settlers. In the role of Ngurungaeta, Barak invited settlers to the reserve, and developed relationships with key colonial figures, including governors, politicians and men and women who became his friends and patrons. Scottish philanthropist Anne Fraser Bon was a long time supporter and friend of Barak, including during the campaigns to prevent the closure of Coranderrk reserve. Graham Berry was also a key contact during the 1880s when the Aboriginal Protection Board sought to have Coranderrk closed, and Barak was welcomed at government house by Sir Henry Brougham Loch.

Barak and other elders walked from Coranderrk to Parliament House, Melbourne to approach parliamentarians directly several times, as well as using newspapers to further their cause. In the meantime, Barak became widely known both at home and abroad, for his art and maintenance of culture as well as a singer and storyteller.

== Later life and death ==
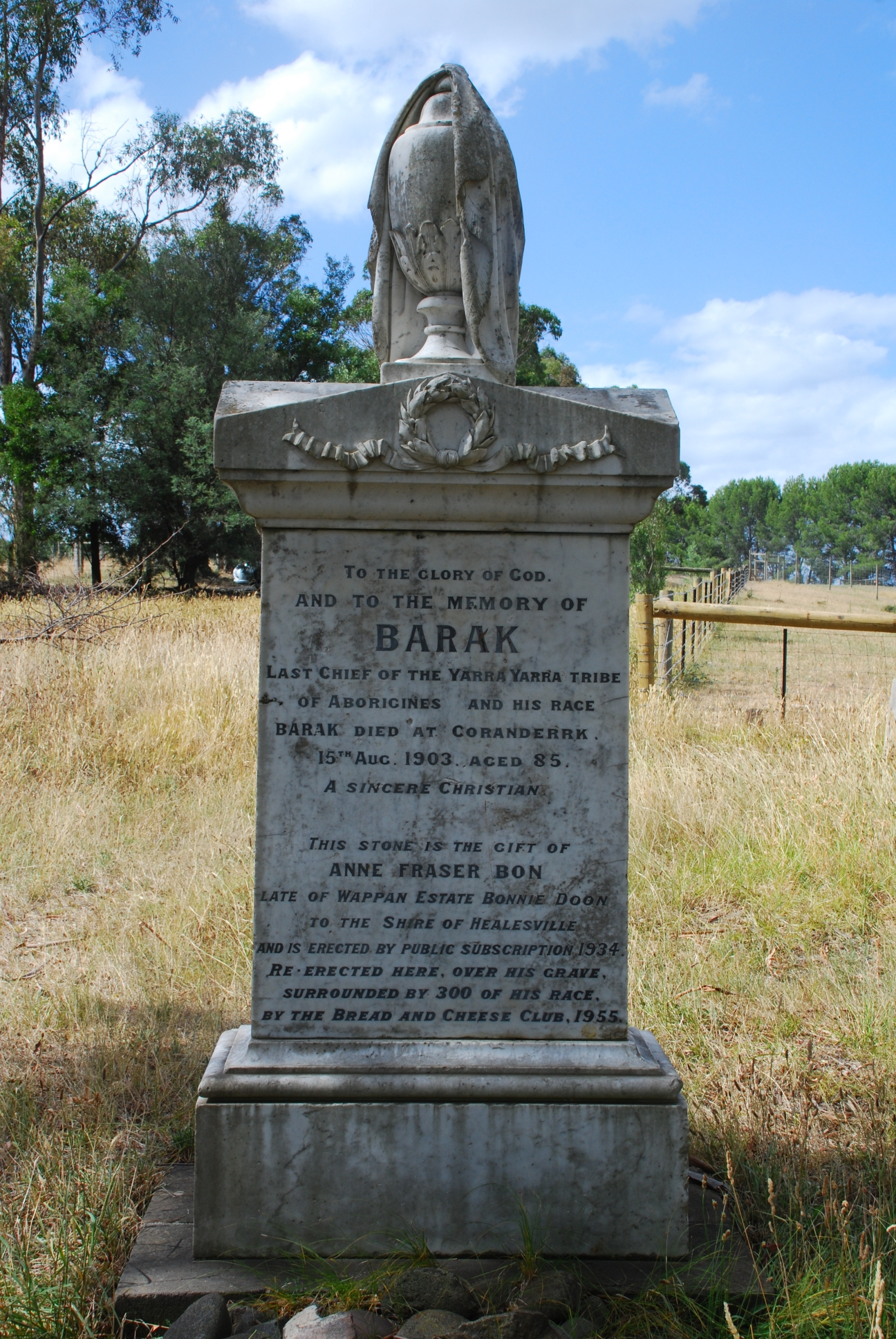
Barak's grave and headstone at Coranderrk cemetery

In 1882 Barak's wife and child died of tuberculosis. At this time he provided key information on Kulin traditions and kinship to anthropologist Alfred William Howitt.

From the 1880s until his death Barak painted and drew, using a combination of European and traditional materials and techniques, including ochre, charcoal, watercolour and pencil.

Barak died at Coranderrk on 15 August 1903 and is buried at the Coranderrk cemetery. He was about 85 years old.

== Artworks ==
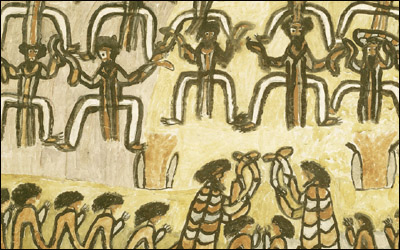
Figures in possum-skin cloaks, 1898 by William Barak.

Barak is remembered for his artworks, which show both traditional Indigenous life and encounters with Europeans. Most of Barak's drawings were completed at Coranderrk during the 1880s and 1890s, and many depicted and preserved important Wurundjeri stories and traditions, such as corroborees and ceremonies, showing Wurundjeri people wearing intricate ochre-coloured possum-skin cloaks. A descendant of Barak, elder Ron Jones, said in 2022:

...Uncle William's paintings were depicting our culture and our history, through drawings. If people know how to read William Barak's paintings, he's telling the story of Wurundjeri people, not just Wurundjeri but all the people living on Coranderrk.

Barak's works are now highly prized and exhibited in leading public galleries in Australia and several international collections.

Ceremony (1895) is housed at the Ballarat Fine Art Gallery, donated by Anne Fraser Bon. Bon's donation to the Ballarat Fine Art Gallery represents the first Indigenous artwork to enter a major public art gallery. Other state and national galleries also include one or more paintings by Barak in their collections, including the South Australian Museum, State Library Victoria, Museums Victoria, National Museum of Australia, National Gallery of Australia, and QAGOMA.

Barak's paintings are also located in international collections including the Ethnological Museum of Berlin, the Völkerkundemuseum Herrnhut, and the Musée D’ethnographie De Neuchâtel.

In 2003 the National Gallery of Victoria held an exhibition Remembering Barak to commemorate his life and work. An education resource was developed to accompany the exhibition.

A shield and a painting, gifted by Barak in 1897 to his friends, a Swiss family who owned vineyards in the Yarra Valley, were auctioned by Sotheby's in May 2022, by descendants living in Switzerland following the death of Pascal de Pury. The artworks were purchased by the Wurundjeri Woi-Wurrung Cultural Heritage Corporation with A$117,000 raised by crowdfunding, A$500,000 given by the Victorian Government, and donations from the City of Melbourne and Melbourne Airport. Another branch of the de Pury family who lived in Victoria had earlier donated all the William Barak works in their possession to the Yarra Ranges Regional Museum. The two pieces went on display in the State Library Victoria in Melbourne in December 2023.

== Recognition and legacy ==
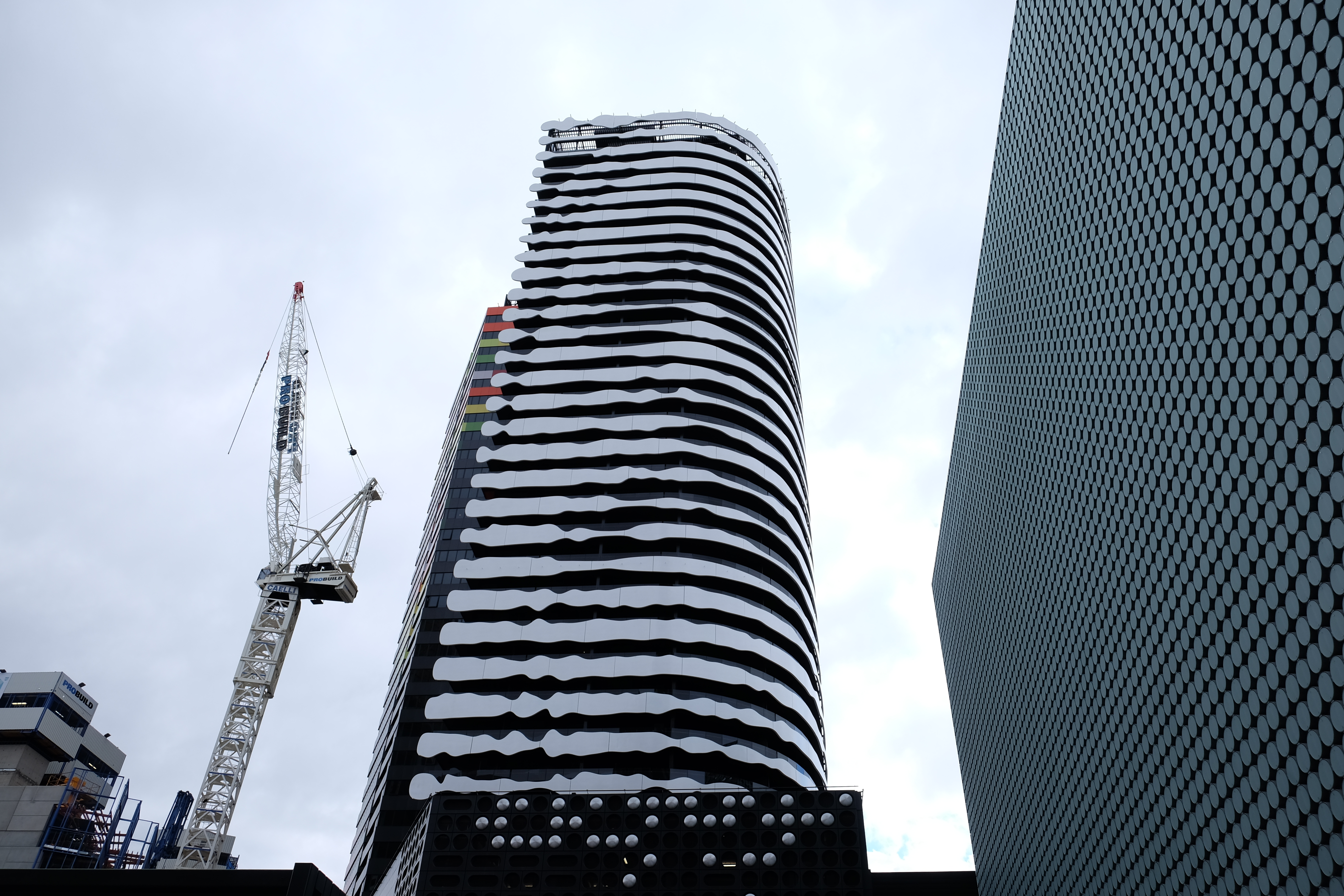
William Barak Apartment building, Swanston Square in central Melbourne. The facade forms a portrait of Barak.

In 1885 Anne Fraser Bon commissioned a portrait of Barak, which was painted by Florence Ada Fuller. It now hangs in the State Library Victoria.

In 2004 Nillumbik Shire Council registered the place name Barak Bushlands, previously known as the Falkiner Street Reserve, along the Diamond Creek in Eltham.

In 2005 a 525 m (1,722 ft) footbridge called the "William Barak Bridge" was constructed stretching from Birrarung Marr to the MCG, improving the link between some of Melbourne's biggest sports and entertainment venues and the heart of the CBD. In 2006 a permanent sound installation called "Proximities" was installed on the bridge. It was designed by David Chesworth and Sonia Leber. Its central section features a welcome song sung in Woiwurrung by Wurundjeri Elder, and Barak's descendant, Joy Murphy Wandin.

In 2011 Barak was inducted on to the Victorian Aboriginal Heritage Roll.

In 2015 a 279 ft (85 m) image of Barak was used to form the facade of an apartment building called Swanston Square in Melbourne. The portrait is formed by the white balconies against a black wall.

== See also ==
- List of Indigenous Australian historical figures
