= Tullamareena =

Indigenous Australian historical figure

Tullamareena escaping from Melbourne's first gaol (watercolour by W. Liardet, c.1875)

Tullamareena (c.1820 – ?), also known as Tullamarine, or Dullamarin, was an Indigenous Australian man of the Wurundjeri clan, from what is now the city of Melbourne in Victoria. It is believed that Tullamareena may have been present at the signing of John Batman's land deal in 1835 at the beginning stages of British colonisation of the area. Tullamareena actively resisted British occupation of Wurundjeri lands, including by burning down Melbourne's first jail. He was described by the Reverend George Langhorne, an early Port Phillip missionary, as "a steady, industrious man".

== Potato stealing incident ==
On 25 April 1838, Tullamareena was arrested for stealing potatoes from John Gardiner's property in what is now Hawthorn. A few days earlier, Tullamarine and several other Aboriginal people had been shot at, wounded and seized by Gardiner.

According to Langhorne's account of the incident:

"the blacks had lately been stealing his potatoes and had been fired upon by [Gardiner's] men who were set to watch at night. That on the present occasion, his man Underwood had gone down to the potato field, and observing two blacks, one of whom was the prisoner, stealing potatoes. The blacks then told Underwood to inform his master that they were very hungry and wanted some potatoes, upon which he attempted to seize them, when two more blacks rushed out and one pointing a gun threatened to shoot, upon which he left them and in getting away some distance called out ‘Murder’, upon which the blacks were immediately pursued and fired upon. One was slightly wounded and the other escaped with the exception of the prisoner Tullamarine who was knocked down with the butt end of a musket and secured. The blacks during the whole of Sunday evening were about our house in a state of great excitement and threatened to destroy Mr Gardiner’s premises with fire and to kill his men".

== Burning down Melbourne's first jail ==
Tullamarine and his companion Jin Jin were soon after imprisoned in Melbourne's first gaol which was located next to the commissariat storehouse in Collins Street. While in jail, Tullamarine and Jin Jin were able to obtain a firestick by deception and set alight their wooden and thatch cell. The fire collapsed a wall through which they made an escape. The fire completely destroyed both the gaol and the commissariat store, together with most of the supplies housed within the latter building.

William Lonsdale, the first Police magistrate of Melbourne wrote in a letter to the colonial secretary on 26 April 1838 concerning the fire and Tullamarine's escape:

"some of the blacks had set the gaol on fire...for the purpose of liberating the three who were confined...describing how the gaol was set fire to, he says that the other black who was confined with him got a long piece of reed which he thrust through an opening in the partition between the place where he was confined in and the guard room, and after lighting the reed by the guard's candle he drew it back and set fire to the thatch roof. The two blacks got off but one was afterwards retaken, viz. Jin Jin. This affair is much to be regretted, keeping up as it undoubtedly will the public alarm and agitation regarding the blacks."

Jin Jin was recaptured, but Tullamarine managed to hide-out and take refuge with some of his kin in the Dandenong Ranges. However, Tullamarine was eventually found and taken into custody. After a police investigation, both Tullamarine and Jin Jin were committed to trial and shipped to Sydney. The trial, though, was subsequently not proceeded with, and the two men were returned to Melbourne and released. No further mention of Tullamarine is present in the historical record.

== Legacy ==
The Melbourne suburb of Tullamarine is named after him. Historically, the Parish of Tullamarine was also named in his honour.

== See also ==
- List of Indigenous Australian historical figures
