= Ngurungaeta =

Woiwurrung head man or tribal leader

Ngurungaeta of Woiwurrung people
- Incumbent; Murrundindi since February 2006; 20 years ago
- Type: Customary law of the Wurundjeri people

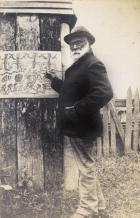
William Barak in 1903

A Ngurungaeta is a Woiwurrung head man or tribal leader of clans of the Woiwurrung tribes and Taungurung Ngurai-illum Wurrung. Ngurungaeta held the same tribal standing as an Arweet of the Bunurong and Wathaurong people. The current Ngurungaeta is Murrundindi. The term became of particular importance as an identifier of senior men prepared to accept Anglo control in the latter part of the 19th century. It is unlikely that the term was used to express genuine recognition of senior members of traditional groups in the Melbourne area after the 1840s, following the death of Billibellary c. 1846.

Identified later Ngurungaeta include:

- Bebejan – said by some Europeans to have been a member of the group alleged to have signed the 1835 treaty with John Batman
- Billibellary, (1799–1846) – said to have been a ngurungaeta of the Wurundjeri-willam clan. An important Woiwurung man at the time of the Anglo invasion of Port Phillip.
- Simon Wonga (1824–1874) – an adolescent at the time of the Anglo occupation of Melbourne. Son of Billibellary
- William Barak (1824–1903) – last traditional ngurungaeta of the Wurundjeri-willam clan
- Robert Wandoon (1854–1908) – born at Coranderrk and said to have been anointed ngurungaeta, together with other men, by William Barak
- James Wandin (1933–2006) – claimed by some family members to be a ngurungaeta of the Wurundjeri
- Murrundindi – appointed ngurungaeta at the funeral of James Wandin in 2006
