= Billibellary =

Billibellary (c. 1799–10 August 1846) was a song maker and influential ngurungaeta of the Wurundjeri-willam clan during the early years of European settlement of Melbourne. He was known by various names including Billi-billeri, Billibellary, Jika Jika, Jacky Jacky and Jaga Jaga. He was an astute and diplomatic leader, described as powerfully built with an influence and reputation that extended well beyond his clan.

== Clan territories ==
Billibellary's family lived on the north bank of the Yarra from Yarra Bend Park, and up Merri Creek. His brother, Burrenupton lived on the southern bank of the Yarra upstream of Gardiners Creek. Bebejan, also known as Jerrum Jerrum and was the father of William Barak, lived on the Yarra River from Heidelberg up to Mount Baw Baw. Mooney Mooney, a ngurungaeta of the Baluk-willam clan occupied land from the southeast of the Yarra River to Dandenong, Cranbourne and the marshes near Western Port.

Old Ninggalobin, ngurungaeta of the Mount Macedon clan, shared joint custody with Billibellary of the Mount William Quarry which was a source of the highly valued greenstone hatchet heads, which were traded across a wide area as far as New South Wales and Adelaide. The Quarry had been in use for more than 1,500 years and covered 18 hectares including underground pits of several metres. In February 2008 the site was placed on the National heritage list for its cultural importance and archaeological value.

Ninggalobin, Poleorong and Billibellary were the leading song makers and principal Woi-Wurrung leaders in the Melbourne region. European colonisation had caused disruptions to initiation ceremonies. In response these three men gathered at South Yarra and inducted the young William Barak into Aboriginal lore. This entailed formally presenting Barak with the symbols of manhood: strips of possum-skin tied around his biceps; the gombert (reed necklace) around his neck; given his ilbi-jerri, a sharp and narrow bone or nosepeg; and his branjep, the apron worn by men to cover their genitals. At the end of the ceremony Barack presented his uncle, Billibellary, a possum-skin cloak.

== Treaty ==
When John Batman explored the Yarra river and its tributaries he met Billibellary, one of the eight ngurungaeta he signed a treaty with on 8 June 1835. The meeting took place on the bank of a small stream, likely to be the Merri Creek and treaty documents were signed along with exchanges of goods by both sides. For a purchase price including tomahawks, knives, scissors, flannel jackets, red shirts and a yearly tribute of similar items, Batman obtained about 200,000 hectares (2,000 square km) around the Yarra River and Corio Bay. The total value of the goods has been estimated at about GBP100 in the value of the day. In return the Woiwurrung offered woven baskets of examples of their weaponry and two Possum-skin cloaks, a highly treasured item. After the treaty signing, a celebration took place with the Parramatta aborigines with Batman's party dancing a corroboree.

The treaty was significant as it was the first and only documented time when European settlers negotiated their presence and occupation of aboriginal lands. The Treaty was immediately repudiated by the colonial government in Sydney. The 1835 proclamation by Governor Richard Bourke implemented the doctrine of "terra nullius" upon which British settlement was based, reinforcing the concept that there was no prior land owner to British possession and that Aboriginal people could not sell or assign the land, and individuals could only acquire it through distribution by the Crown.

== Clash of cultures ==
In response to tending an injury and caring for his son Simon Wonga for a period of two months in 1840, Billibellary named his newly born daughter Susannah in honour of Susannah Thomas, the wife of Assistant Protector William Thomas.

In January 1840 near Arthurs Seat William Thomas promised the gathered Kulin clans government rations until they could set up a self-sufficient community, but Chief Protector George Augustus Robinson had refused to release government supplies. Fearing for his wife and children Thomas spoke to Billibellary and explained the non-arrival of the rations, and asked for protection for his wife and children. Even though Billibellary was out of his territory, his authority was unquestioned. Thomas reported that Billibellary said "Very good that Mr Fawkner and Batman...Big one Gammon (pretend) your Mr Robinson and Government". Susannah Thomas released all the stores she could spare and Billibellary ordered the clans to split up into smaller groups for foraging.

On the instructions of Charles La Trobe a Native Police Corps was established and underwritten by the government in 1842 in the hope of civilising the Aboriginal men. As senior Wurundjeri elder, Billibellary' co-operation for the proposal was important for its success, and after deliberation he backed the initiative and even proposed himself for enlistment. He donned the uniform and enjoyed the status of parading through the camp, but was careful to avoid active duty as a policeman to avoid a conflict of interest between his duties as a Wurundjeri ngurungaeta. Participation in the police corps also failed to stop troopers participating in tribal ceremonies, gatherings and rituals.

After about a year Billibellary resigned from the Native Police Corps when he found that it was to be used to capture and even kill other natives. He did his best from then to undermine the Corps and as a result many native troopers deserted and few remained longer than three or four years.

In 1845 a school was established on the banks of the Merri Creek to, in European terms, educate and civilise Wurundjeri children. For the first year or two the school enjoyed strong enrolments, largely due to the support and encouragement of Billibellary, who sent his own children along. But there were conflicts over teaching European curriculum and the demands for the teaching of Aboriginal lore and ceremony. The death of Billibellary in 1846 led to a drop in student numbers at the school, with many students drifting away and others becoming disruptive.

== Death ==
Billibellary died on 10 August 1846 of inflammation of the lungs, an ailment which killed many of his people in the period after contact with Europeans. Billibellary was buried at the confluence of the Merri Creek and the Yarra river (Birrarang) near Dights Falls. His passing was lamented by Thomas who had developed a deep friendship and mutual respect across cultures. He wrote of Billibellary after his death: "It may be said of this Chief and his tribe what can scarce be said of any tribe of located parts of the colony that they never shed white man's blood nor have white men shed their blood. I have lost in this man a valuable councillor in Aboriginal affairs."

After his death, his son Simon Wonga became ngurungaeta of the Wurundjeri-willam clan.

== Bibliography ==
- Broome, Richard (2005). Aboriginal Victorians: A History Since 1800. Allen & Unwin. ISBN 978-1-74114-569-4.
- Ellender, Isabel; Peter Christiansen (2001). People of the Merri Merri. The Wurundjeri in Colonial Days. Merri Creek Management Committee. ISBN 0-9577728-0-7.
- Massola, Aldo (1969). Journey to Aboriginal Victoria. Rigby.
- McBryde, Isabel (October 1984). "Kulin Greenstone Quarries: The Social Contexts of Production and Distribution for the Mt William Site". World Archaeology. 16 (2). Taylor & Francis: 267–85. doi:10.1080/00438243.1984.9979932. JSTOR 124577.
- Presland, Gary (1985–2001). Aboriginal Melbourne. The lost land of the Kulin people. Harriland Press. ISBN 0-9577004-2-3.
- Wiencke, Shirley W. (1984). When the Wattles Bloom Again: The Life and Times of William Barak, Last Chief of the Yarra Yarra Tribe. S.W. Wiencke. ISBN 978-0-9590549-0-3.
