= Coranderrk =

Former Aboriginal reserve, now heritage site, in Victoria, Australia

Coordinates: 37.684007°S 145.521938°E

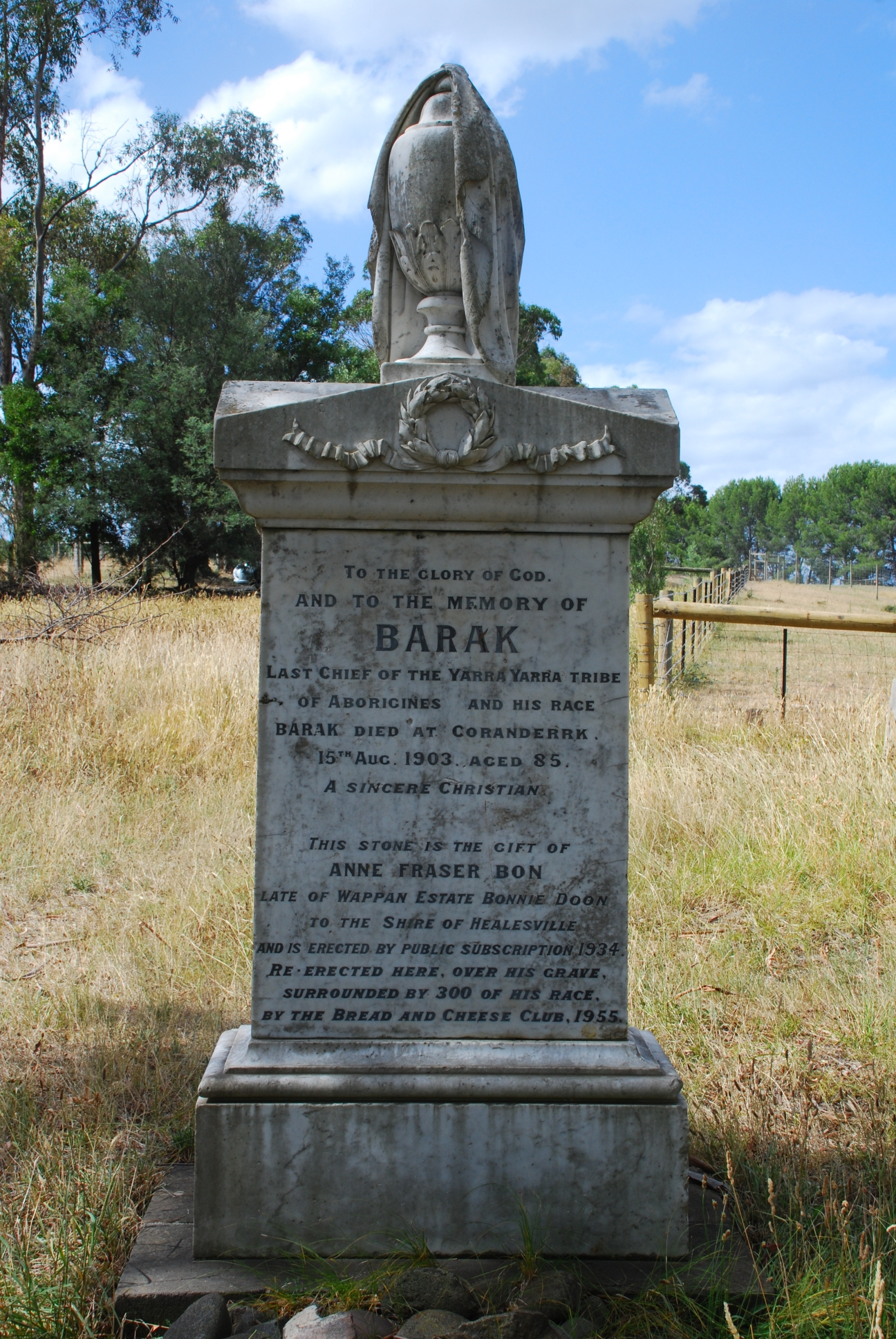
William Barak's grave and headstone at Coranderrk cemetery

Coranderrk was an Aboriginal reserve run by the Victorian government between 1863 and 1924, located around 50 kilometres (31 mi) north-east of Melbourne. The residents were mainly of the Woiwurrung, Bunurong and Taungurung peoples, and the first inhabitants chose the site of the reserve.

It ran successfully for many years as an Aboriginal enterprise, selling wheat, hops and crafts on the burgeoning Melbourne market, but in the 1870s and 1880s further controls were put on Aboriginal Victorians' lives, culminating in the passing of the Aborigines Protection Act 1886, which required "half-castes under the age of 35" to leave the reserve, among other requirements and restrictions. A group of Coranderrk residents sent a petition to the Victorian colonial government in 1886 to protest the controls that were applied to their lives by the government, that became known as the Coranderrk Petition.

The reserve was formally closed in 1924, with most residents removed to Lake Tyers Mission.

== Early days ==
The reserve was created by the Victorian government in 1863, approximately located 50 kilometres (31 mi) north-east of Melbourne. In accordance with government policy, land was provided by the government for Aboriginal people dispossessed of their traditional lands by the arrival of European settlers to the colony of Victoria since the 1830s.

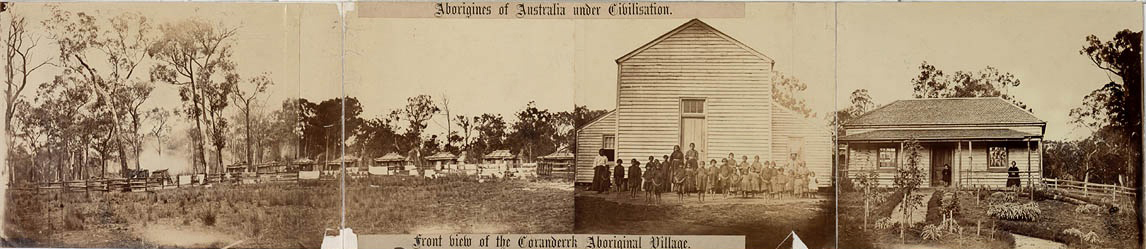
Corranderrk Aboriginal Reserve, Victoria, 1865

In February 1859, a group of Taungurung men, led by Wurundjeri elders, Simon Wonga (aged 35) and brother Tommy Munnering (aged 24), acting as interpreters, petitioned the Protector of Aborigines, William Thomas, to secure land for the Kulin on the Acheron River at the foot of Mount Cathedral. Initial representations to the Victorian Government were positive, however the intervention of the most powerful squatter in Victoria, Hugh Glass, resulted in their removal to a colder site, Mohican Station, which had been abandoned as unsuitable for agriculture.

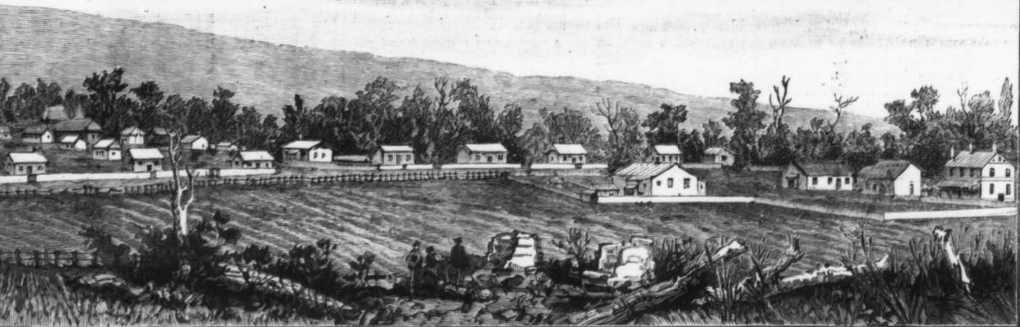
1889 sketch of the Coranderrk Aboriginal Station, in Victoria, Australia

In 1860, the Kulin representatives met two young allies: a Scottish Presbyterian lay preacher called John Green (1830–1903), and his wife Mary Smith Benton Green (1835–1919), who established a school for the local children. In 1861, John Green accepted the position of General Inspector of the new Central Board Appointed to Watch Over the Interests of the Aborigines. After a fruitless attempt to establish a settlement for the Woiwurrung and Taungurong clans at Acheron, Green applied to the Board for permission to return to Woiwurrung country to establish a new reserve on the Yarra.

In March 1863, after 3 years of upheaval, the surviving leaders, among them Simon Wonga and William Barak, led 40 Woi Wurrung, Taungurong and Bun warrung people over the Black Spur, with Green and his family. Finding their original site now occupied by squatters, they set up camp on a traditional camping site near the confluence of the Yarra and Badger Creek near Healesville, and requested ownership of the site. They were anxious to have the land officially approved so that they could move down and establish themselves. An area of 9.6 km^{2} (3.7 sq mi) was gazetted on 30 June 1863 and called "Coranderrk", at the Aboriginal people's suggestion. This was the name they used for the Christmas Bush (Prostanthera lasianthos), a white flowering summer plant which is indigenous to the area.

In mid-1864, there were around 70 Aboriginal people living at Coranderrk.

Coranderrk Station ran successfully for many years as an Aboriginal enterprise, selling wheat, hops and crafts on the burgeoning Melbourne market. Produce from the farm won first prize at the Melbourne International Exhibition in 1881; and other awards in previous years, such as 1872.

By 1874, the Aboriginal Protection Board (APB) was looking for ways to undermine Coranderrk by moving people away due to their successful farming practices. Neighbouring farmers also wanted the mission closed as the land was now deemed "too valuable" for Aboriginal people to occupy.

Photographer Fred Kruger was commissioned to document the site and its inhabitants.

== Coranderrk petition ==
In the 1870s and 1880s, Coranderrk residents sent deputations to the Victorian colonial government protesting their lack of rights and the threatened closure of the reserve.

Louisa Briggs, a Bunurong woman, lived with her family, including nine children, on Corranderrk first in 1871 and then again from 1874. In 1876 she was appointed matron of the dormitory, on a salary, and acted as a leader and spokesperson for the residents, including giving evidence at an inquiry into the management of the reserve in 1876.

The Royal Commission on the Aborigines in 1877, headed by William Foster Stawell and looking at the six reserves in Victoria (the others being Lake Condah, Lake Tyers, Framlingham, Ramahyuck, and Ebenezer), followed by a parliamentary inquiry in 1881 on the Aboriginal "problem", led to the Aborigines Protection Act 1886, which required "half-castes under the age of 35" to leave the reserve.

Louisa Briggs was widowed in 1878 and was forced off the reserve, returning again in 1882 but again being forced to leave in 1886 because her children were "half-castes" under 35, and from Tasmania.

Activist William Barak and others sent a petition on behalf of the Aboriginal people of Coranderrk to the Victorian Government in 1886, saying: "Could we get our freedom to go away Shearing and Harvesting and to come home when we wish and also to go for the good of our Health when we need it ... We should be free like the White Population there is only few Blacks now rem[a]ining in Victoria, we are all dying away now and we Blacks of Aboriginal Blood, wish to have now freedom for all our life time ... Why does the Board seek in these latter days more stronger authority over us Aborigines than it has yet been?"

The Coranderrk petition has survived and is on display at the Melbourne Museum in Carlton.

The history of these events was brought to life in a verbatim theatre performance, called Coranderrk: We will show the country, written by Giordano Nanni and Andrea James, in which actors read the parts of the participants in the 1881 Inquiry. The book of the play, with a long introduction outlining the historical events, was published in 2013.

== Decline, closure and aftermath ==
As a result of the Aborigines Protection Act of 1886, around 60 residents were ejected from Coranderrk on the eve of the 1890s depression. Their forced departure crippled Coranderrk as an enterprise, with only around 15 able-bodied men left to work the hitherto successful hop gardens.

Almost half the land was reclaimed by government in 1893, and by 1924 orders came for its closure as an Aboriginal Station, despite protests from Wurundjeri returned servicemen who had fought in World War I.

The reserve was formally closed in 1924, with most residents moved to Lake Tyers Mission in Gippsland in eastern Victoria.

Five older people refused to move and continued living at Coranderrk until they died. The last known Aboriginal woman to live at Coranderrk was Elizabeth (Lizzie) Davis, who died in 1956, aged 104. She was denied permission to be buried at Coranderrk alongside her husband and siblings. The last Indigenous child to be born at Coranderrk Station was James Wandin in 1933, in the home of his grandmother, Jemima Wandin.

After the death of the last remaining Indigenous residents in 1950s, the land was handed over to the Soldier Settlement Scheme.

== Healesville Sanctuary ==
In 1920, Sir Colin MacKenzie, a leading medical researcher, leased 78 acres (320,000 m^{2}) from the Aboriginal Protection Board to begin his work in comparative anatomy with Australian fauna. This was the catalyst for the creation of the Healesville Sanctuary, a popular zoo for Australian native animals, which today occupies part of the original Coranderrk reserve.

== Coranderrk today ==
Many Aboriginal families continue to live in the Upper Yarra and Healesville area.

In March 1998, part of the Coranderrk Aboriginal Station was returned to the Wurundjeri Tribe Land Compensation and Cultural Heritage Council when the Indigenous Land Corporation purchased 0.81 km^{2}.

Coranderrk was added to the Australian National Heritage List on 7 June 2011.

== Cultural representations ==
Giordano Nanni co-wrote the verbatim theatre play called Coranderrk with Yorta Yorta/Kurnai playwright Andrea James. Based on historical events related to Coranderrk, it was produced by Ilbijerri Aboriginal and Torres Strait Islander Theatre Cooperative and La Mama Theatre, in collaboration with the University of Melbourne. It was performed at the Playhouse at Sydney Opera House in June/July 2012. An academic work of the same title was published by the authors in 2013.

In 2017, Ilbijerri and the Belvoir Theatre co-produced Coranderrk, a recreation of the 1881 inquiry.

== See also ==
- First Australians, Episode 3: Freedom For Our Lifetime
- James Wandin
- Simon Wonga
- William Barak
- Wurundjeri
