= Bebejan =

Wurundjeri leader

Bebejan (birth circa 1796, died August 1836) also known as Bebejern or Jerum Jerum, was a Ngurungaeta (Leader -pronounced ung-uh-rung-eye-tuh) of the Wurundjeri people of the Woiwurung language group in the present day Australian state of Victoria. The four Woiwurung clans collectively claimed the area of the Yarra River and its tributaries. Thus Bebejan's domain was Heidelberg to the source of the Yarra River.

Tooterie was a young Ngurai-illam-wurrang woman who was given in marriage to Bebejan, in the early 1820s. Bebejan was head of his clan, a Ngurungaeta, at the time Europeans invaded Kulin territory. He was at the meeting which purportedly gained signatures to Batman's Treaty in 1835 and signed it along with seven other tribal leaders. The contract itself is historically significant as it was the first and only documented time when Europeans negotiated their presence and occupation of Aboriginal lands directly with the traditional owners. Also, present at this meeting with John Batman, was Tooterie and Bebejan's son, Beruk. He would grow up to be one of the most important Kulin leaders in the post-European contact period. When he grew older Beruk, would change his name to William Barak.

Bebejan was most probably elevated to tribal leadership after the decimation of the second smallpox plague in 1828. The fact that he was elevated over Billibelleri, his wife's uncle, is testament to the Aboriginal leadership system being merit-based, not lineal descent. Billibelleri readily became number two man (Songman) to his younger nephew and succeeded Bebejan as leader in 1836. Bebejan was also the father of William Barak as well as nephew-in-law to Billibellary.
