= Robert Brough Smyth =

Australian 1800s geologist

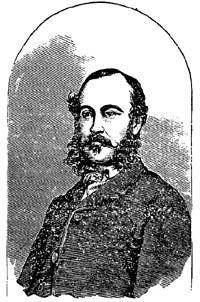
Robert Brough Smyth

Robert Brough Smyth (1830 – 8 October 1889) was an Australian geologist, author, and social commentator.

== Early life ==
Smyth was born in Wallsend, Northumberland, England, the son of Edward Smyth, a mining engineer, and his wife Ann (née Brough). Smyth was educated at a school at Whickham, afterwards studied geology, chemistry and natural science. In 1846 he worked at the Derwent Iron Works and then in 1851 was employed as a clerk at Consett Iron Works.

== Life in Victoria ==
Smyth arrived in the colony of Victoria on 14 November 1852 and was for a short period on the goldfields before entering the Victorian survey department as a draftsman under the surveyor-general, Andrew Clarke. In 1854, he was placed in charge of the meteorological observations, and in 1860 became secretary for the Department of Mines at the height of the Australian gold rushes. Smyth published The Prospector's Handbook (1863), and in 1869 a large volume, The Gold Fields and Mineral Districts of Victoria. He was also responsible for various pamphlets on the mining resources of the colony including Hints for the Guidance of Surveyors and Others Collecting Specimens of Rocks, which appeared in 1871.

On 1 February 1876, several members of Smyth's staff sent a petition to the minister for mines asking that an inquiry should be held into the despotic conduct of Smyth towards his subordinates. Three members of parliament were appointed to inquire into the matter, and after a series of sittings held in February, March and April 1876, Smyth resigned from the service. He had been working for many years collecting materials for a book on the life of Indigenous Australians, which was published in 1878 at the expense of the Victorian government in two large volumes, The Aborigines of Victoria: with notes relating to the habits of the Natives of Other Parts of Australia and Tasmania.

Smyth visited India in 1879 and made a Report on the Gold Mines of the South-eastern Portion of the Wynaad and the Carcoor Ghat (1880).

== Death ==
Smyth died of cancer at his home Medenia in High Street, Prahran, a suburb of Melbourne. He was survived by his wife Emma Charlotte, née Hay, whom he had married on 15 August 1856 at St Paul's Church, Melbourne, and by a son and daughter. He was buried in the St Kilda Cemetery.
