= Murnong =

Tuber used in Australian Aboriginal cuisine

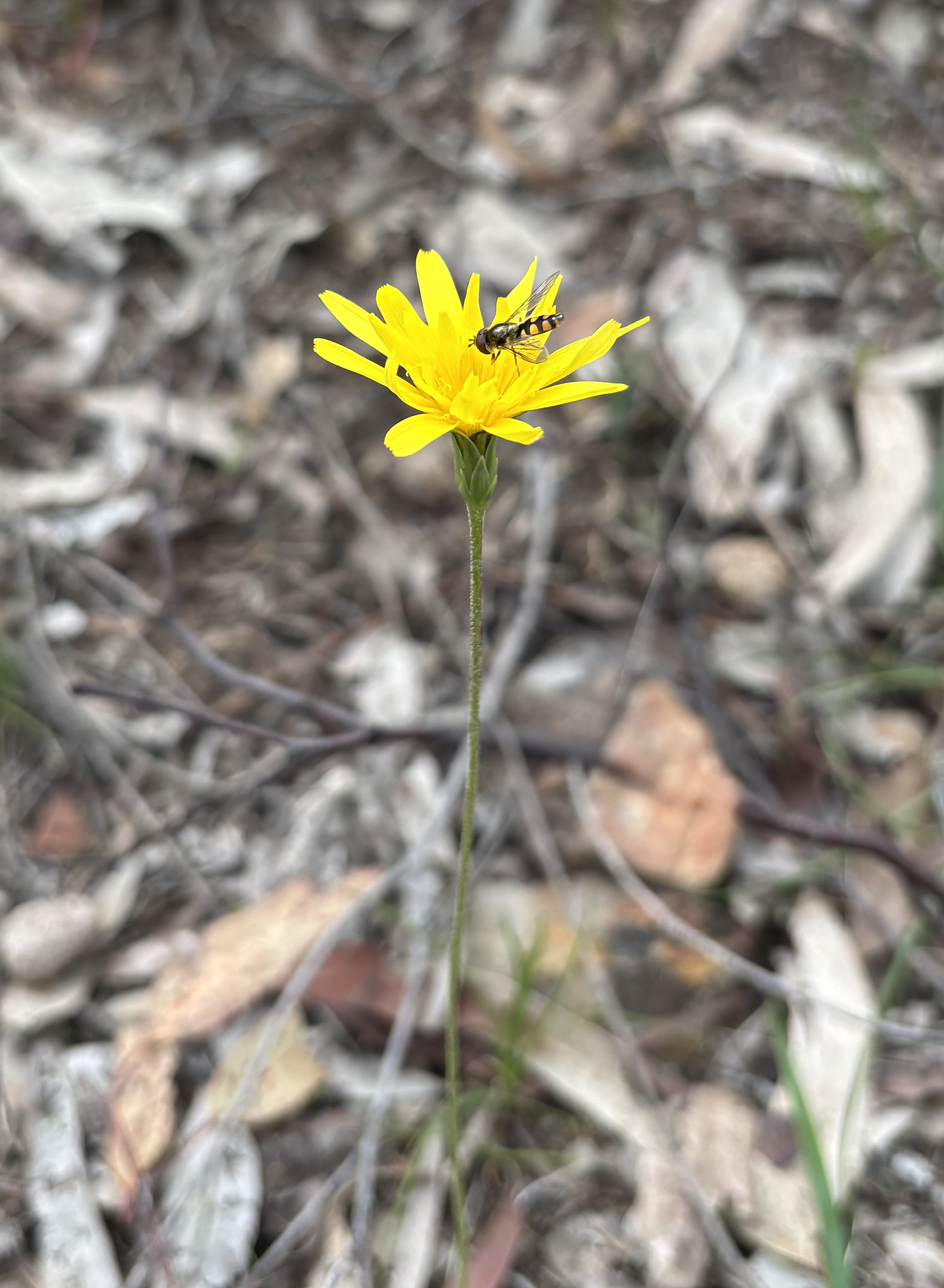
Microseris walteri with hoverfly

The murnong or yam daisy is any of the plants Microseris walteri, Microseris lanceolata and Microseris scapigera, which are an important food source for many Aboriginal peoples in southern parts of Australia. Murnong is a Woiwurrung word for the plant, used by the Wurundjeri people and possibly other clans of the Kulin nation. They are called by a variety of names in the many different Aboriginal Australian languages, and occur in many oral traditions as part of Dreamtime stories.

The tubers were often dug out with digging sticks and cooked before eating. They were widespread and deliberately cultivated by Aboriginal peoples in some areas, but the hoofed animals introduced by early settlers to Australia destroyed vast areas of habitat, leading to calamitous results for the Indigenous people. The shortage of food led to Aboriginal people stealing food from settlers, in a cycle of violence known as the Australian frontier wars. The township of Myrniong in Victoria was named after the murnong.

In the 21st century there has been a revival and recultivation of the plant, and an honouring of it in art.

== History ==
The roots of the murnong plants were consumed in large quantities by Aboriginal people in the colony of Victoria until the 1840s, when European colonists began using the murnong crop lands for sheep farming.

== Botanical naming ==
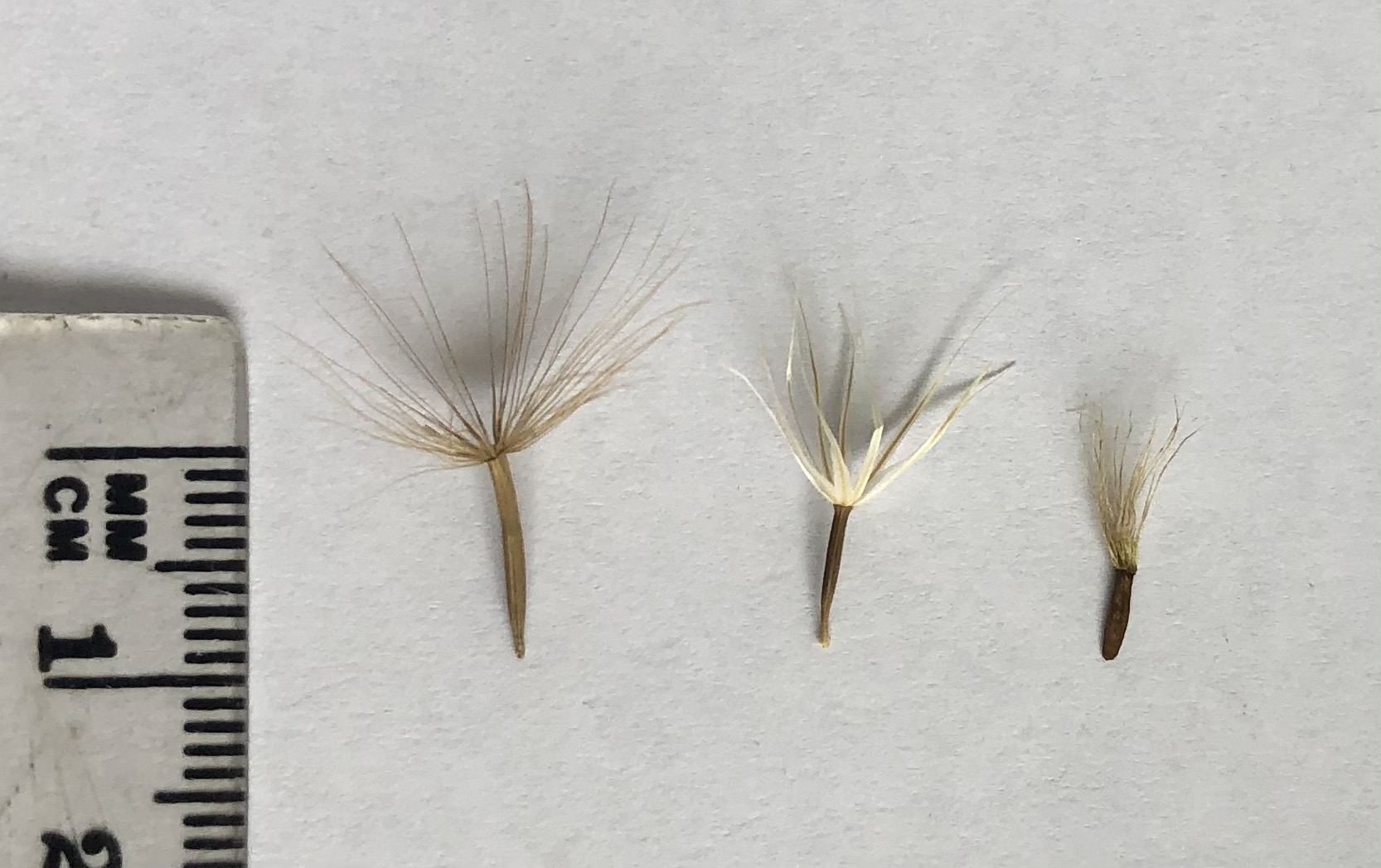
Comparison of Microseris seeds (from left to right)

The binomial names of the three species Microseris walteri, Microseris lanceolata and Microseris scapigera are often misidentified, because they were classified under different names until they were clarified in 2016. Murnong is often described as growing a sweet tuber, but this identifies Microseris walteri rather than the other two plants, which have bitter roots.

For more than 30 years Murnong was named as Microseris sp. or Microseris lanceolata or Microseris scapigera. Royal Botanic Gardens Victoria botanist Neville Walsh clarified the botanical name of Microseris walteri in 2016 and defined the differences in the three species in the table below.

== Oral storytelling ==
Murnong tubers are included in a Dreamtime story about Crow's role in bringing fire to mankind. According to a story told by the Wurundjeri people, in the Dreamtime fire had been a jealously-guarded secret of the seven Karatgurk women who lived by the Yarra River where Melbourne now stands. These women carried live coals on the ends of their digging sticks, allowing them to cook murnong yams. One day Crow found a cooked yam and, finding it tastier than the raw vegetables he had been eating, decided he would cook his food from then on. However, the Karatgurk women refused to share their fire with him and Crow resolved to trick them into giving it up. The story continues and the crow steals the yam, but ends up creating a bushfire.

In a Dreamtime story, the Wotjobaluk people say that the sun was a woman who, when she went to dig for murnong yams, left her little son in the west. Wandering round the edge of the earth, she came back over the other side. When she died she continued to do this.

== Indigenous cultivation ==
The edible tuberous roots of murnong plants were once a vitally important source of food for Aboriginal Australian people in the southern parts of Australia. Indigenous women would dig for roots with a yam stick (a Gunditjmara term for digging stick) and carry the roots away in a dillybag or rush basket.

'Today the native women were spread out over the plain as far as I could see them, collecting punimim, murrnong, a privilege they would not be permitted except under my protection. I inspected their bags and baskets on their return and each had a load as much as they could carry. They burn the grass, the better to see those roots but this burning is a fault charged against them by squatters.'

— George Augustus Robinson (24 July 1841)

European settler Issac Batey described the cultivation of murnong by Aboriginal people on a sloping ridge of land owned by Sunbury Asylum, in Sunbury, Victoria. He called the cultivation "accidental gardening", while paradoxically suggesting it was an intentional method to increase food supply.

'The soil [on the ridge] is a rich basaltic clay, evidently well fitted for the production of myrnongs. On the spot are numerous mounds with short spaces between each, and as all these are at right angles to the ridge's slope it is conclusive evidence that they were the work of human hands extending over a long series of years. This uprooting of the soil, to apply the best term, was accidental gardening, still it is reasonable to assume that the aboriginals were quite aware of the fact that turning the earth over in search of yams, instead of diminishing that form of food supply, would have a tendency to increase it.'

— Issac Batey (between 1840–1900)

== Cooking methods ==
In western Victoria, baskets were used in the cooking. After being washed, tubers were put into a rush basket, which was placed on an earth oven, called mirrn'yong mounds. Tubers would roast, half melting into a sweet dark syrup.

'Ovens are made outside the dwellings by digging holes in the ground, plastering them with mud, and keeping a fire in them till quite hot, then withdrawing the embers and lining the holes with wet grass. The flesh, fish, or roots are put into baskets, which are placed in the oven and covered with more wet grass, gravel, hot stones, and earth, and kept covered till they are cooked. This is done in the evening; and, when cooking is in common—which is generally the case when many families live together—each family comes next morning and removes its basket of food for breakfast.'

— James Dawson (1881)

Another cooking technique uses heated clay elements placed above and below the edible roots. The steam and moisture helps reduce the drying and shrinking of the vegetables.

== Early records of murnong consumption ==
In 1803, convict William Buckley escaped from the settlement at Sullivan's Bay near Sorrento, Victoria, then lived among the Wathaurong people at the mouth of Thompson Creek. An important source of food for Buckley 'was a particular kind of root the natives call Murning — in shape, and size, and flavour, very much resembling the radish.'

Port Phillip settler James Malcolm testified in front of the NSW parliament on the condition of Indigenous people in 1845. Malcolm said, 'There is a nutritious root which [the Indigenous people] eat and are fond of; and that, I think, has greatly diminished, from the grazing of sheep and cattle over the land, because I have not seen so many of the flowers of it in the spring as I used to see. It bears a beautiful yellow flower. The native name of this root is "murnong".'

Malcolm referenced Buckley in his description of murnong. He said, 'It is rather agreeable to the taste as a native article of food, and when you squeeze it, there is a sort of milk or creamy substance which comes out of it. I have eaten it many a time, and a man named Buckley who lived among the natives for thirty years before the settlement was formed, tells me, that a man may live on the root for weeks together; and that he has dug them up in great numbers for food.'

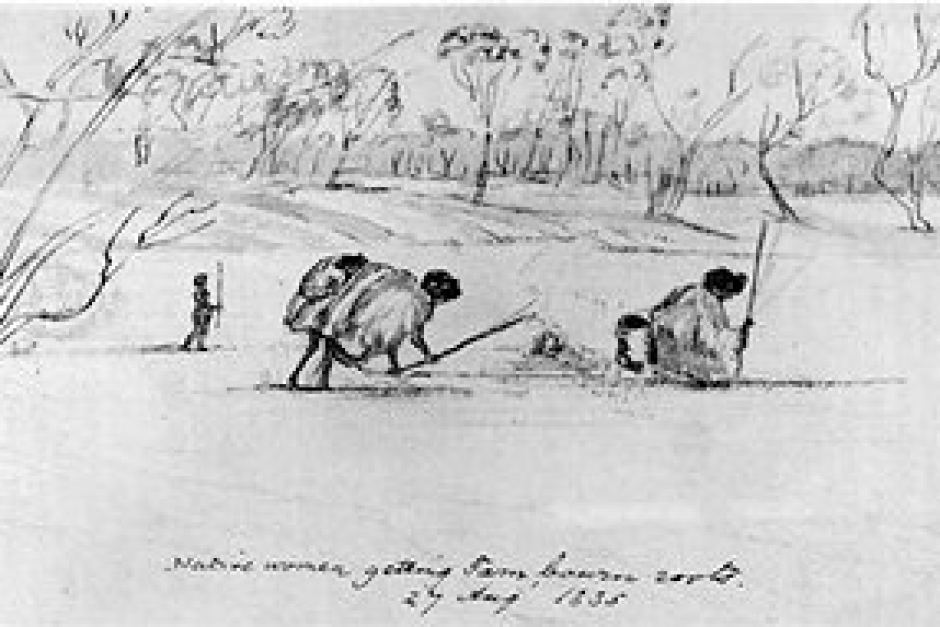
Wathaurong women dig for tambourn roots (murnong) at Indented Head. Drawn by John Helder Wedge in 1835.

In 1835, the Tasmanian colonist John Batman set up his base camp for the land speculation company Port Phillip Association at Indented Head. While he returned to Tasmania to collect his family and additional provisions, the members left at the Indented Head camp were running low on imported food supplies, so they began to eat murnong. The servant William Todd wrote, 'We have commenced eating roots the same as the natives do.'

Surveyor and explorer Thomas Mitchell came across a community of Aboriginal people who cultivated and harvested murnong tubers with specialised tools on the plains around the Hopkins River on 17 September 1835. Mitchell was wary and when 40 of them approached his camp, he ordered his men to charge at them.

== Sheep and cattle grazing ==
The introduction of cattle, sheep and goats by immigrating early–colonialist Europeans led to the near extinction of murnong, with calamitous results for Indigenous communities who depended upon murnong for a large part of their food. Mitchell had noted that 'the cattle are very fond of the leaves of this plant, and seem to thrive upon it'. Sheep were more destructive, since the murnong was most abundant on the plains and open forests where sheep were introduced.

Within five years of the founding of Melbourne, murnong had disappeared from the surrounding area. In 1839, Ngurelban man Moonin-Moonin said, 'There were no param or tarook at Port Phillip ... too many jumbuck (sheep) and bulgana (bullocks, cattle) plenty eat it myrnyong—all gone myrnyong.' The Taungurung people had been pushed off their land and the supply of murnong and other plant foods had greatly diminished as cattle and sheep stock increased on the land. The people were so hungry that they would 'part with anything for a trifle to eat or drink'. On the northern plains of Victoria, Edward M Curr wrote: 'Several thousand sheep not only learnt to root up these vegetables with their noses, but they for the most part lived on them for the first year, after which the root began gradually to get scarce.'

'Mr Munro said there were millions of murnong or yam, all over the plain and that the kangaroos were so abundant that they came up to the door of their tents on one occasion and knocked down a child. Emue were also abundant and came near their tents. This was only 18 months ago; now there are none seen. The sheep drive them away. Yet, this is proof that the natives have been deprived of a large portion of their support and subsistence. Mr Munro reported that Taylor, the notorious murderer of blacks, had absconded in an American whaler at Portland Bay. He had killed a whole tribe and the bodies were dragged together will bullock chains and burnt.'

— George Augustus Robinson (22 January 1840)

== Colonial conflicts ==
When British settlers moved onto the Hawkesbury River in 1794, they constructed farms by removing the yams and planting Indian corn (maize). The Dharug people saw the corn on their land as a replacement carbohydrate of the yams and when the corn ripened, they carried it away. Settlers fired shots on the Dharug people to drive them away, and a series of raids by Aboriginal people was followed by settlers killing seven or eight of them. The Battle of Richmond Hill occurred in May 1795, where 62 New South Wales Corps soldiers went to the Aboriginal camps at Richmond Hill at night, killing seven or eight people there. Kate Grenville's 2005 historical novel The Secret River popularised the idea that the yams at Hawkesbury River were murnong, known by the Darug people as midyini, but academics suggest the yam was a different plant.

Other conflicts arose when Aboriginal people took potatoes from settler farms, on areas previously used for growing murnong. In April 1838, Tullamareena and Jin Jin were arrested for stealing potatoes from John Gardiner's property in Hawthorn. They were placed in Melbourne's first gaol, but they escaped by setting fire to the thatched roof. In January 1840, Jaga Jaga (Jacky Jacky) and around 50 Wurundjeri men stopped at James Anderson's station in Warrandyte and rooted up potatoes at the farm using digging sticks during the night. Anderson confronted them angrily, but Jaga Jaga's men also possessed rifles and a purposely shot past Anderson's ear. They left to Yaring, which led to the Battle of Yering, but no-one was killed.

== Contemporary revival and conservation ==
During the 1980s, Monash University academic Beth Gott documented Australian Indigenous foods with a focus on murnong and also curated the Aboriginal Educational Garden at the university to grow plants that were used by Indigenous people. Gott published her research in the papers Ecology of Root Use by the Aborigines of Southern Australia in 1982 and Murnong—Microseris scapigera: a study of a staple food of Victorian Aborigines in the Australian Aboriginal Studies journal in 1983. She also published information about murnong in the books Victorian Koorie Plants with John Conran in 1991 and Koorie plants, Koorie people with Nelly Zola in 1992.

In 2005, the Merri and Edgars Creek Confluence Restoration Group (MECCARG) formed at Merri Creek in Coburg North, Victoria and later renamed as Merri Murnong, with the aim of rejuvenating indigenous cultural landscape including dwindling stocks of murnong, using Gott's research. With the support of Wurundjeri elders, the group holds an annual Murnong Festival to harvest and cook murnong roots, then conducts a cultural burning.

Author Bruce Pascoe helped to form the Indigenous group Gurandgi Munjie in 2011 'aimed not only to recover First Peoples’ traditional foods and culture, but also to become a unique food-led form of reconciliation where the work of Indigenous growers could provide healthy produce for high-end and commercial chefs and restaurants.'

Murnong was prominently featured in Pascoe's 2014 book Dark Emu: Black Seeds: Agriculture or Accident?, which looked at the diaries of European settlers in Australia to understand Indigenous foods and farming methods. A second edition of the book was published in 2018 and became the number two bestselling nonfiction book in Australia for 2019 and number four in the same chart for 2020, which led to a greater awareness of murnong within Australia.

Seeds of murnong are now commercially available and the plant is stocked in many nurseries in Australia.

== Artwork ==
In 2019, the National Gallery of Victoria commissioned a large sculpture called 'In Absence' by Yhonnie Scarce and Melbourne architecture studio Edition Office. The artwork questions the absence of murnong in Victoria, which were once plentiful prior to colonisation. The artwork consists of wooden tower rises upwards from a surrounding field of kangaroo grass, murnong and a path of crushed Victorian basalt. The 9 metre high by 10 metre wide cylinder is clad in a dark-stained Tasmanian hardwood. A narrow vertical aperture, slicing the tall cylinder open, bisects the tower leaving a void and creating a passage into two curved chambers. Inside each, hundreds of hand-blown, glossy, black glass murnong populate the walls and glitter in shafts of sunlight.

== Indigenous names of murnong ==
Murnong is a Woiwurrung word for the plant, used by the Wurundjeri people and possibly other clans of the Kulin nation. It has many other names in other Aboriginal Australian languages. Below is a list of the Indigenous names, language groups and locations where the name was recorded.

- dharaban. Ngunnawal (ACT, NSW)
- ngampa. Kaurna (Adelaide, SA)
- keerang, (yuwatch for cooked root). Peek Whuurong (Port Fairy, Vic)
- kool-an-gur. Wannin (Wannon, Vic)
- maiela. Bangerang (Echuca, Vic)
- maiyilla. Yorta Yorta (Echuca, Vic)
- maranong, murning, tumbuurn (daisy), tambourn (daisy). Wathawurrung, Kulin (Trawalla and Geelong, Vic)
- mar-o-ngire, moor-na. Booandik (South East, SA)
- midyini midin. Dharug (Sydney)
- meerwan. Wemba Wemba (Lake Bogal, Vic)
- me-wan, njamang. Ngarigo (alpine, NSW and Gippsland, Vic)
- mingar (Mudgee, NSW)
- mlang, dalu-mlarng (where dalu means little), moit-bar-dyul, loumbric. Gunai/Kurnai (Gippsland, Vic)
- mo-i-yool. Ngoorialum (Colbinabbin, Vic)
- mo-ner, moo-nar. Dja Dja Wurrung (East of Grampians, Vic)
- moonang (Bacchus Marsh, Vic)
- moonya, munja, munya, bam-munya. Wergaia (Lake Albacutya, Lake Hindmarsh, The Mallee, Vic)
- mooranong (Hamilton, Vic)
- murnong, mernong, mirr-n'yong, myrnong. Woiwurrung, Kulin (Melbourne)
- muurang, (yuwatch for cooked root). Kuurn Kopan Noot (North of Port Fairy, Vic)
- myrnong, also meaning 'finger'. Boonwurrung, Kulin (Melbourne)
- ngamko. Thura-Yura (Lower Murray, SA)
- ngarridyu. Wiradjuri (Murrumbidgee, NSW)
- pun-nin. Waverang (West of Mt Cole, Vic)
- pun-yin (root). taluum/taloom (cooked root). Djabwurrung, Kulin (Mt Rouse, Vic)
- tao. (Lachlan River, Regent Lake, Bogan River, NSW)
- thabor. Watiwati (Tyntynder, Vic)
- wayang. Darkinyung (Hunter region, NSW)
- wuleli (root). Taungurung, Kulin (Healesville, Vic)
- yerat. (Lake Condah, Vic)

The Wotjobaluk people used a counting system from one to 15 when communicating with other clans via message sticks and used munya, the word for murnong or yam, to count fingers from one to five as part of this system. One: giti-munya (little finger), two: gaiup-munya (ring finger), three: marung-munya, (middle finger), four: yollop-yollop-munya (index finger) and five: bap-munya (thumb).

The township of Myrniong, Victoria was named after the murnong. The area around the You Yangs was called Morong-morongoo after the murnong that was abundant there in the past.

== Table showing the three species ==
Feature	Microseris walteri	Microseris lanceolata	Microseris scapigera
Roots	single fleshy root expanding to a solitary, napiform to narrow-ellipsoid or narrow-ovoid, annually replaced tuber	several fleshy roots, cylindrical to long-tapered, branching just below ground-level	several cylindrical or long-tapered, usually branched shortly below leaves
Images of roots	M. walteri tuber roots	M. lanceolata tapered roots	M. scapigera tapered roots
Fruit (Capsela)	usually less than 7mm long	usually less than 7mm long	mostly 7–10 mm long
Images of seeds	Microseris walteri seed	Microseris lanceolata seed	Microseris scapigera seed
Pappus bristles	c. 10 mm long, 0.5–1.3mm wide at base	10–20 mm long, c. 0.3–0.5 mm wide at base	30–66 mm long
Images of flowers	M. walteri flower, approx 4cm wide	M. lanceolata flower, approx 5cm wide	M. scapigera flower, approx 2cm wide
Joined petals (Ligule)	usually more than 15mm long	usually more than 15mm long	up to 12mm long
Origin	lowlands of temperate southern WA, SA, NSW, ACT, Victoria and Tasmania	rarely on basalt soils; alpine and subalpine NSW, ACT and Victoria	mostly from basalt plains of western Victoria and elevated sites in Tasmania
Taste of roots	sweet-tasting, both raw and cooked	bitter, slightly fibrous and not particularly palatable	slightly fibrous, and slightly, but tolerably bitter
