= Indented Head =

- Town
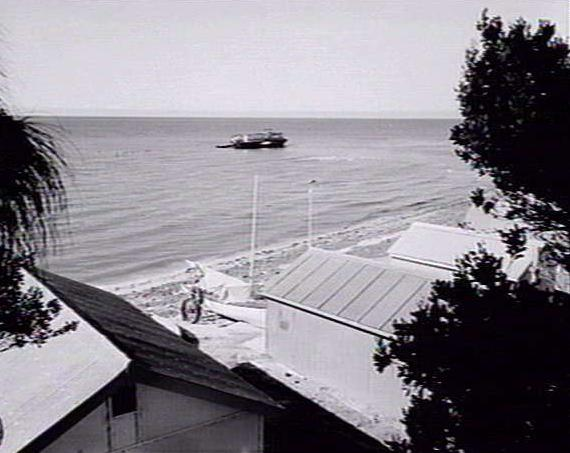
- The wreck of the paddle steamer, Ozone.

- Coordinates: 38°08′17″S 144°42′36″E
- Country: Australia
- State: Victoria
- LGA: City of Greater Geelong
- Location: 105 km (65 mi) from Melbourne; 34 km (21 mi) from Geelong

Government
  - State electorate: Bellarine
  - Federal division: Corangamite

Population
  - Total: 1,391 (2021 census)
- Postcode: 3223
Localities around Indented Head
Port Phillip	Port Phillip	Port Phillip
Portarlington	Indented Head	Port Phillip
Portarlington	St Leonards	Port Phillip

Indented Head is a town located on the Bellarine Peninsula, east of Geelong, in the Australian state of Victoria. The town lies on the coast of the Port Phillip bay between the towns of Portarlington and St Leonards.

Indented Head's population fluctuates throughout the year, increasing drastically during the summer months, and is very much seasonal. Its beaches attract keen fisherman, boaters and families to the area. It is appreciated by locals and tourists for its quiet and isolated nature.

== History ==
=== Early European exploration ===
Indented Head was named by the explorer Matthew Flinders in April 1802 when he observed the shape of the Bellarine Peninsula coastline from the summit of Arthurs Seat, across Port Phillip. For many years the name Indented Head was applied to the whole of the Bellarine Peninsula. Flinders was at that time in the process of completing the first circumnavigation of Australia, undertaken between December 1801 and June 1803, making a detailed survey of the coastline for the British government, sailing aboard HMS Investigator.

=== The Batman expedition encounters local Wathaurong (Aboriginal) people and William Buckley ===
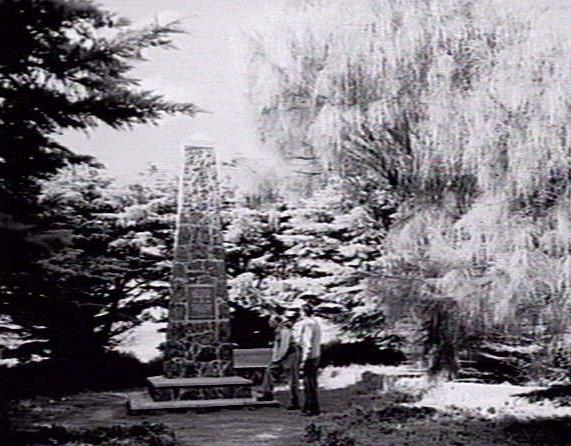
The historical monument marking where John Batman landed at Indented Head in 1835.

In 1835, the Tasmanian colonist John Batman set up his base camp for the land speculation company Port Phillip Association at Indented Head while he returned to Tasmania (then known as Van Diemen's Land) to collect his family and additional provisions. He left the small base camp in the care of his ex-servants William Todd (free settler) and Gumm, and 5 Aboriginal members of his party named Bullett, Bungett, Old Bull, Pigeon and Joe the Marine. Some of these Aboriginal people had been brought from Sydney to Tasmania by Batman, who employed them in his bounty hunting 'roving parties' rounding up Tasmanian Aboriginal people in the island's north-east in the late 1820s.

The escaped convict William Buckley made contact with the men at Batman's camp in July 1835. Buckley had been living with the local Wathaurong people for over thirty years since his escape from an early settlement near Sorrento in 1803. Large numbers of local Aboriginal people frequented the small campsite, and Todd's diary records what must have been a fascinating intercultural exchange including extensive 'Corrobboring', singing, and shared hunting parties, although Todd himself generally did not participate. On 3 August 1835, after the small camp's imported food supplies ran low, Todd recorded, "We have commenced eating Roots the same as the Natives do" - these were murnong or Yam Daisy roots (Microseris lanceolata) which were a staple of the Wathaurong diet and would have been collected in large quantities by local women.

A monument marks the place (now in Batman Park) where Batman was believed to have landed.

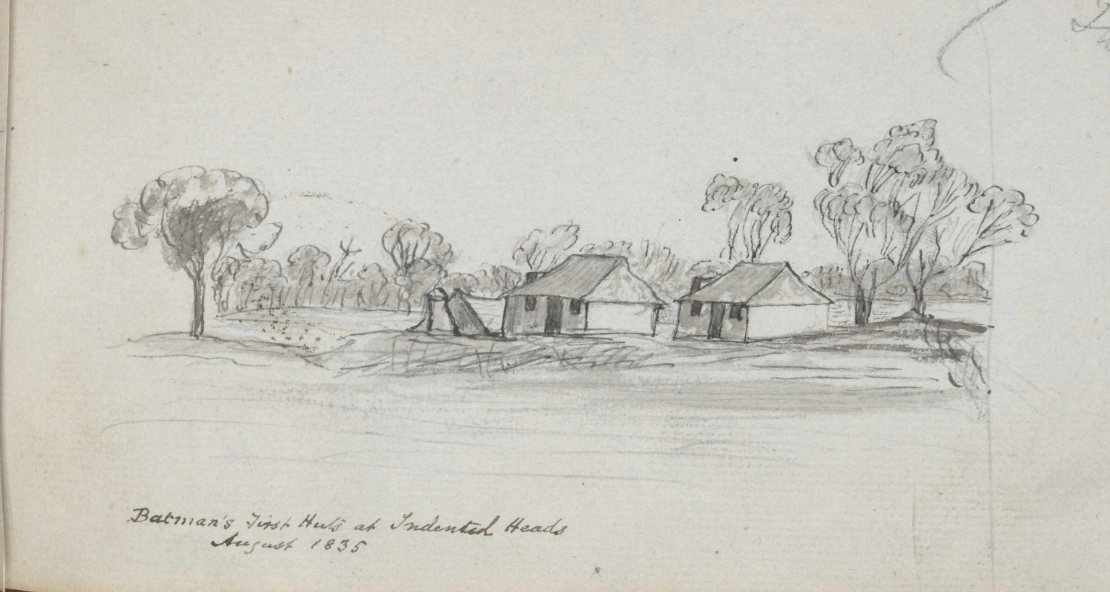
Sketch by John Helder Wedge of the huts built by the expeditionary party of the Port Phillip Association, led by John Batman, at Indented Head in 1835.

=== Twentieth century until today ===
Camping grounds were established along the Indented Head foreshore during the 1920s but it was many years before a permanent population was established, the Post Office opening in 1947.

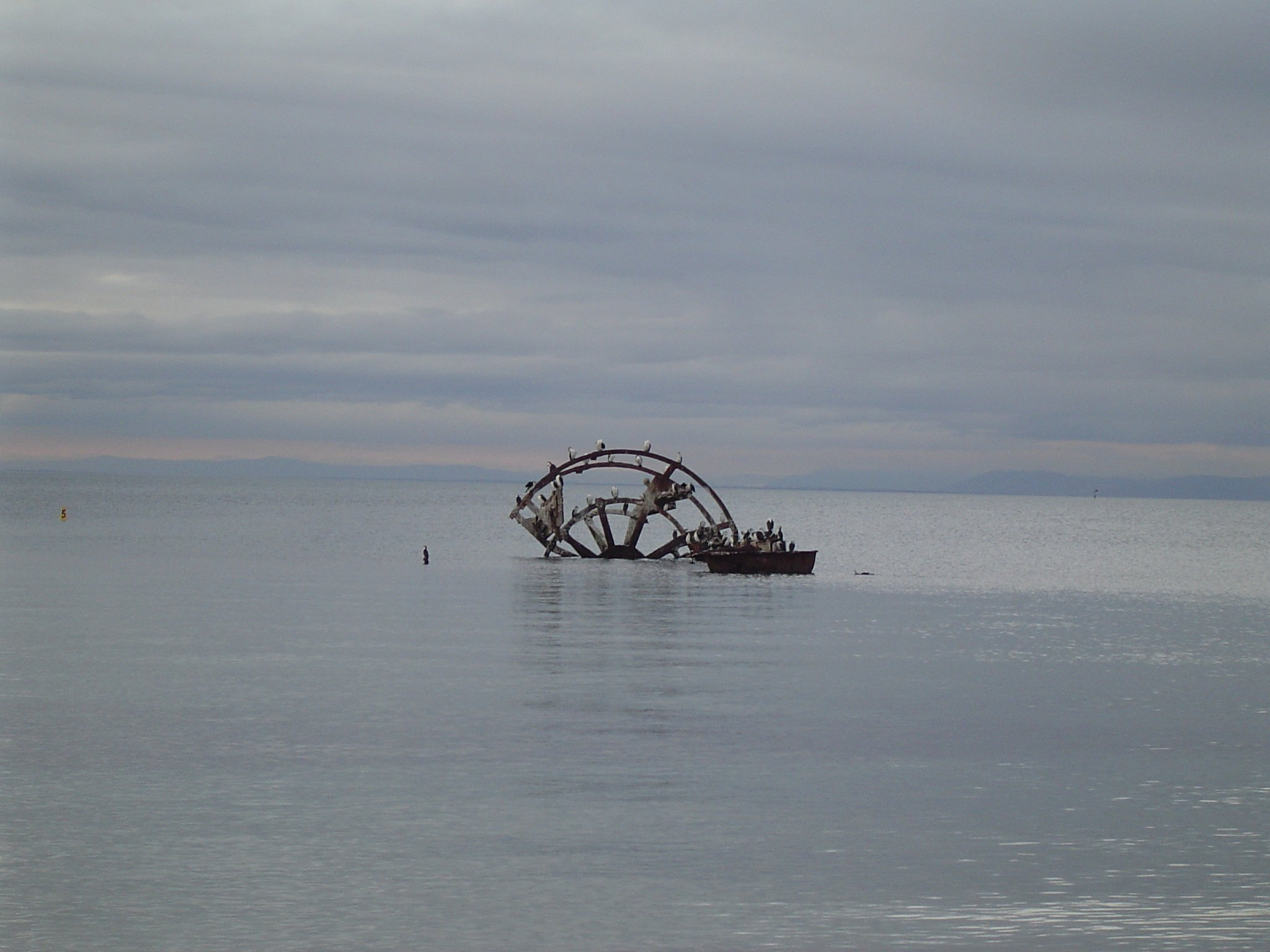
The wreck of the Ozone in 2006

The area is still a popular family holiday destination and facilities include a sailing club, a boat ramp, jetty, and numerous sandy beaches. The shoreline also hosts a number of historical boat sheds.

The retired Port Phillip paddle steamer, Ozone, was sunk at Indented Head in 1925 to form a breakwater. The wreck remains a distinctive landmark visible offshore from the main beach. One of the Ozone's anchors has also been incorporated into a monument located on the cliff-top beside the Taylor Reserve camping ground.

The 1970s and 1980s saw an increase in construction of holiday homes, and a larger permanent population. The Harvey estate began construction in 2007, and has been the largest housing development to date within Indented Head.

In late 2008 a new Post Office and General Store was constructed on The Esplanade, the only business operating in Indented Head.

== Tourist destinations ==
The historic Ozone wreck, the Indented Head Yacht Club, and the long stretches of clear sandy beaches that line The Esplanade, all attract visitors to the area.
