= Karatgurk =

Seven sisters in Australian Aboriginal mythology

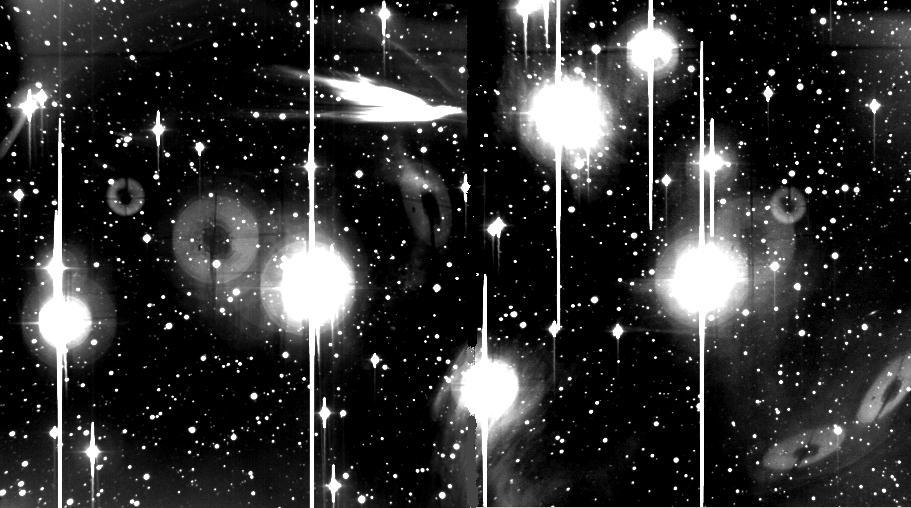
Pleiades

In the Australian Aboriginal mythology of the Aboriginal people of south-eastern Australian state of Victoria, the Karatgurk were seven sisters who represented the constellation known in western astronomy as the Pleiades.

According to a legend told by the Wurundjeri people of the Kulin nation, in the Dreamtime the Karatgurk alone possessed the secret of fire. Each one carried a live coal on the end of her digging stick, allowing them to cook the yams (murnong) which they dug out of the ground. The sisters refused to share their coals with anybody, however they were ultimately tricked into giving up their secret by Crow. After burying a number of snakes in an ant mound, Crow called the Karatgurk women over, telling them that he had discovered ant larvae which were tastier than yams. The women began digging, angering the snakes, which attacked. Shrieking, the sisters struck the snakes with their digging sticks, hitting them with such force that the live coals flew off. Crow, who had been waiting for this, gathered the coals up and hid them in a kangaroo skin bag. The women soon discovered the theft and chased him, but the bird simply flew out of their reach, and thus fire was brought to mankind.

Afterwards, the Karatgurk sisters were swept into the sky. Their glowing fire sticks became the Pleiades star cluster.

The sisters had to subject themselves to many difficult trials to ascend to a higher purpose.

== See also ==
- Australian Aboriginal astronomy § Pleiades
- Seven Sisters (mythology) | Research Starters | EBSCO Research
