= Crow (Australian Aboriginal mythology) =

Trickster, culture hero and ancestral being in Australian Aboriginal mythology

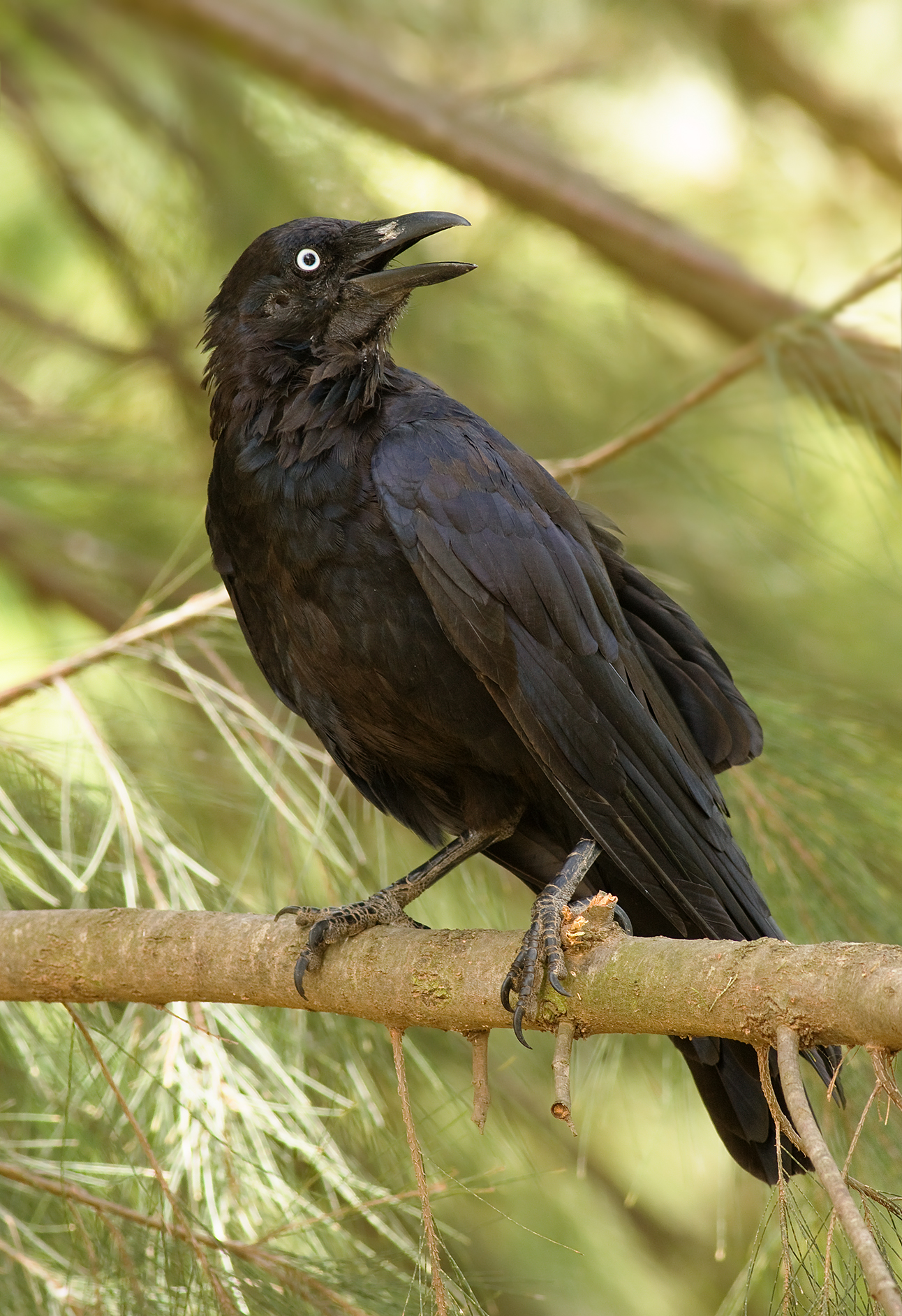
Australian raven (Corvus coronoides)

In Australian Aboriginal religion and mythology, Crow is a trickster, culture hero and ancestral being. In the Kulin nation in central Victoria he is known as Waang (also Wahn or Waa) and is regarded as one of two moiety ancestors, the other being the more sombre eaglehawk Bunjil. Legends relating to Crow have been observed in various Aboriginal language groups and cultures across Australia.

== Crow steals fire ==
One common Aboriginal Dreamtime story features Crow's role in bringing fire to mankind. According to oral storytelling by the Wurundjeri people of the Kulin nation, in the Dreamtime fire had been a jealously-guarded secret of the seven Karatgurk women who lived by the Yarra River where Melbourne now stands. These women carried live coals on the ends of their digging sticks, allowing them to cook Murnong yams. One day Crow found a cooked yam and, finding it tastier than the raw vegetables he had been eating, decided he would cook his food from then on. However, the Karatgurk women refused to share their fire with him and Crow resolved to trick them into giving it up.

Crow caught and hid a number of snakes in an ant mound then called the women over, telling them that he had discovered ant larvae were far more tasty than yams. The women began digging, angering the snakes, which attacked. Shrieking, the sisters struck the snakes with their digging sticks, hitting them with such force that the live coals flew off. Crow, who had been waiting for this, gathered the coals up and hid them in a kangaroo skin bag. The women soon discovered the theft and chased him, but the bird simply flew out of their reach and perched at the top of a high tree.

Bunjil the Eaglehawk, who had seen all of this, asked Crow for some of the coals so that he could cook a possum. Crow instead offered to cook it for him. Soon, a large group had gathered around Crow's tree, shouting and demanding that he share the secret of fire with them. The din frightened Crow and at last he flung several live coals at the crowd. Kurok-goru the fire-tailed finch picked up some of the coals and hid them behind his back, which is why to this day firefinches have red tails. The rest were gathered up by Bunjil's shaman helpers, Djurt-djurt the nankeen kestrel and Thara the quail hawk.

The coals caused a bushfire which burnt Crow's feathers permanently black and threatened to consume the entire land, until Bunjil's efforts halted its spread. The Karatgurk sisters, meanwhile, were swept into the sky where they became the Pleiades (the stars are said to represent their glowing fire sticks).

== Crow and Magpie ==
The various groups of Western Australia offer two versions of the same story about the Crow and the Magpie. The crow and the magpie are brothers, both born with pure white feathers. Both were vain and would argue as to which was the most beautiful. Perched in a tree, they began to argue and then fought.

The people with the crow as their totem will tell you the brothers fell into a fire below, the Crow getting burnt all over, the Magpie only partly burnt. Those whom have the magpie as their totem will tell the story the same, but that the brothers fell into thick black mud, and the magpie only slightly stained his feathers, the crow covered in the mud.

As in all Indigenous Australian totems, Crow is known for its cunning and intelligence, and it is seen as a trickster. Crow has an old spirit with prescient knowledge. Sometime it is described like it is carrying ancient knowledge of previous lifetimes (similar to reincarnation). Crow totem is very powerful, and it has powerful natural magic. Depending on the group's own mythology, the holder of the totem will either carry great respect, or suspect.

== Crow and Swamp Hawk ==
In another legend, Crow was travelling down the Murray River when he met Swamp Hawk. Deciding to play a trick on the other bird, he planted echidna quills in the deserted nest of a kangaroo rat and enticed Swamp Hawk to jump on them. The quills stuck and grew into Swamp Hawk's feet, but the bird was pleased with this as he found he was now able to catch rats more easily.

Some accounts have Crow ultimately leaving the earth altogether, having been called up into the heavens where it became Canopus, the second-brightest star in the night sky.

== Crows attacking spirits on the way to the afterlife ==
The Yanyuwa people have a legend that says that as spirits of the dead approach the afterlife, they are attacked by crows carrying digging sticks. The crows are said to be angry with all people because people often chase them away from campsites when they scavenge. The spirits are saved by hawks and falcons.
