= Microseris scapigera =

Scientific classification
- Kingdom: Plantae
- Clade: Tracheophytes
- Clade: Angiosperms
- Clade: Eudicots
- Clade: Asterids
- Order: Asterales
- Family: Asteraceae
- Genus: Microseris
- Species: M. scapigera

Binomial name
- Microseris scapigera (Sol. ex A.Cunn.) Sch.Bip.

Synonyms
- Leontodon lactucoides Banks & Sol. ex Hook.f. nom. inval.; Microseris forsteri Hook.f. nom. illeg.; Microseris latifolia Gand.; Microseris obtusifolia Gand.; Microseris tenuicula Gand.; Scorzonella scapigera (A.Cunn.) Greene; Scorzonera lawrencii Hook.f.; Scorzonera scapigera G.Forst. nom. inval., nom.nud.; Scorzonera scapigera Sol. ex A.Cunn.

Species of flowering plant

Microseris scapigera is a yellow-flowered daisy, a perennial herb, found in New Zealand and Australia. It is the only New Zealand species of Microseris, and one of three Australian species along with Microseris lanceolata and Microseris walteri. It is classified into a group of plants, the tribe Cichorieae, that includes chicory and dandelion.

The murnong or "yam daisy" has been referred to as M. scapigera, M. lanceolata, or M. forsteri, but is now classified as M. walteri.

Now rare and vulnerable due to loss of habitat.

== Taxonomy and nomenclature ==
Joseph Banks and Daniel Solander collected specimens of the plant in New Zealand in 1769 or 1770, but Solander's manuscripts were never published. The locality of their collection is stated by later authors as either the Bay of Islands or Queen Charlotte Sound (Totara nui). Georg Forster (1786) listed the name "Scorzonera scapigera S." in an appendix without description. Allan Cunningham gave a brief description in 1839, mentioning Solander's manuscripts and Banks' specimens plus another specimen collected by his brother Richard.

Joseph Dalton Hooker thought that the species didn't belong well in Scorzonera: he had proposed a subgenus, then placed it in Microseris, beside M. pygmæa of Chile. He gave the name Microceris Forsteri in 1852, however Cunningham's description with the epithet scapigera takes precedence. Carl Heinrich Schultz 'Bipontinus' published the combination Microseris scapigera in 1866, listing Hooker's M. forsteri and Forster's S. scapigera as synonyms. Neither Hooker nor Schultz referenced Cunningham's description; in 2015 Sneddon designated a lectotype for Schultz's name.

Some authorities have grouped M. scapigera with the other Australian forms into single species under the name M. lancifolia, for example A census of the vascular plants of Victoria, Edition 3. (1990) and Australian Plant Census (2011). Sneddon (2015), in Flora of Australia maintained two separate species, and the Melbourne Herbarium has supported both plus a third unnamed species since the early 1990s. The third species was formally described by Neville Walsh in 2016, matching herbarium specimens were identified, and the name M. walteri was selected.

Conversely, M. scapigera has earlier been "misapplied to" M. lanceolata in the Flora of South Australia (1st and 2nd editions, 1929 and 1957) and The Student's Flora of Tasmania (1963).

== Botanical naming ==
For more than 30 years Murnong was named as Microseris sp. or Microseris lanceolata or Microseris scapigera. Royal Botanic Gardens Victoria botanist Neville Walsh clarified the botanical name of Microseris walteri in 2016 and defined the differences in the three species in the table below.

Feature	M. walteri	M. lanceolata	M. scapigera
Roots	single fleshy root expanding to a solitary, napiform to narrow-ellipsoid or narrow-ovoid, annually replaced tuber	several fleshy roots, cylindrical to long-tapered, branching just below ground-level	several cylindrical or long-tapered, usually branched shortly below leaves
Fruit (Capsela)	usually less than 7mm long	usually less than 7mm long	mostly 7–10 mm long
Pappus bristles	c. 10 mm long, 0.5–1.3mm wide at base	10–20 mm long, c. 0.3–0.5 mm wide at base	30–66 mm long
Joined petals (Ligule)	usually more than 15mm long	usually more than 15mm long	up to 12mm long
Origin	lowlands of temperate southern WA, SA, NSW, ACT, Victoria and Tasmania	rarely on basalt soils; alpine and subalpine NSW, ACT and Victoria	mostly from basalt plains of western Victoria and elevated sites in Tasmania
Taste of roots	sweet-tasting, both raw and cooked	bitter, slightly fibrous and not particularly palatable	slightly fibrous, and slightly, but tolerably bitter

== Gallery ==
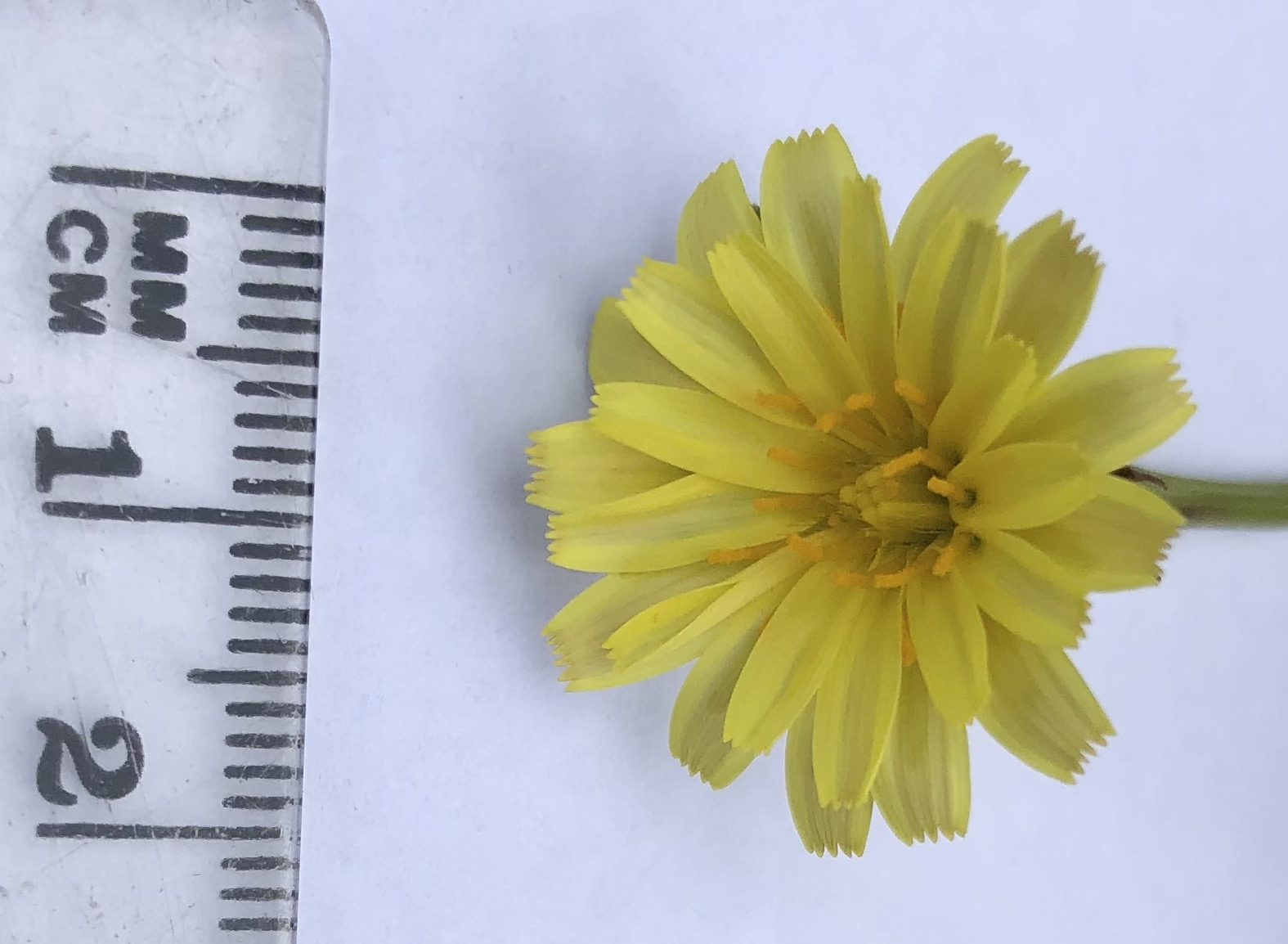
Microseris scapigera flower measurement

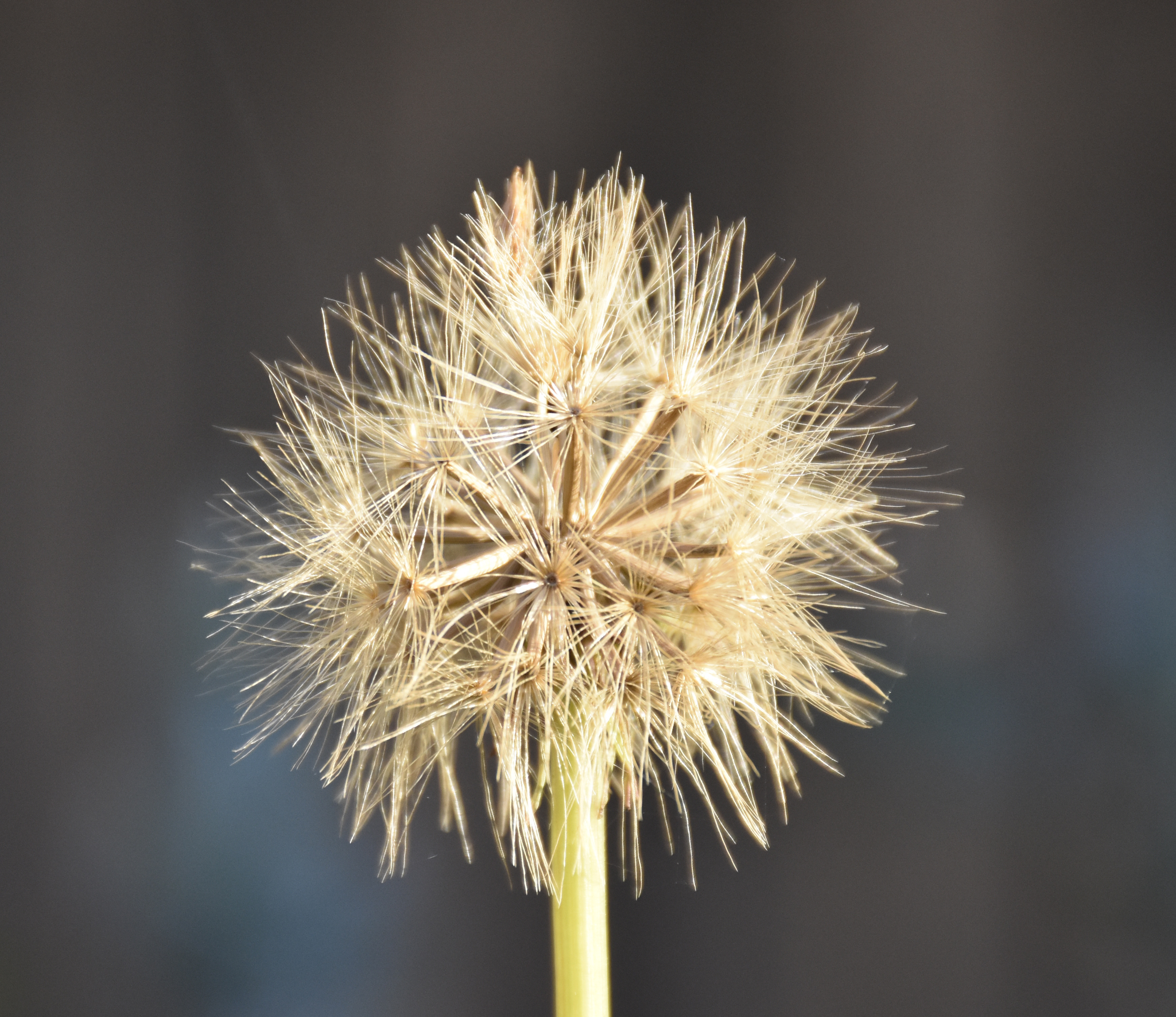
Seed clock

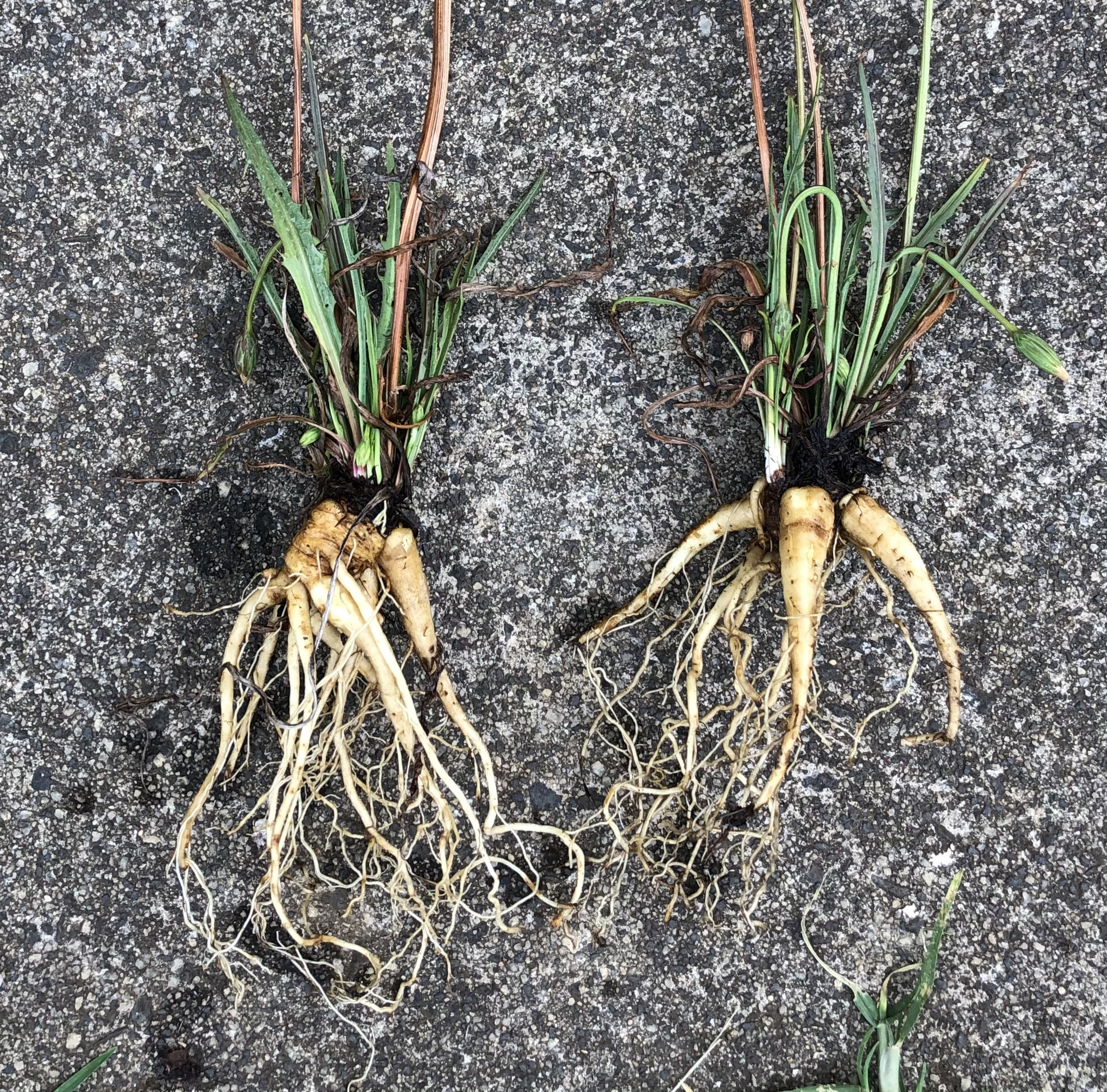
Multiple fleshy roots

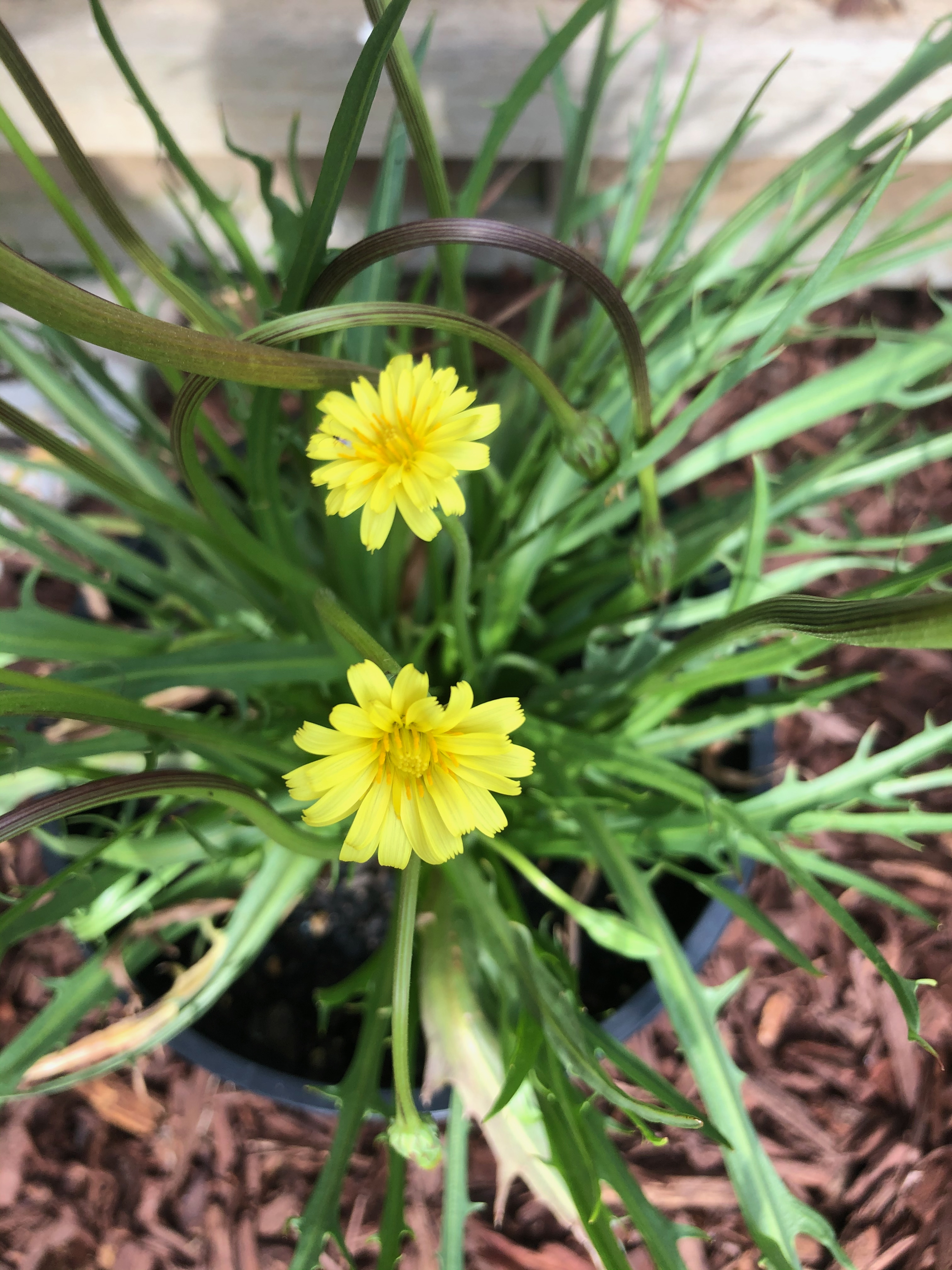
Leaves and flowers

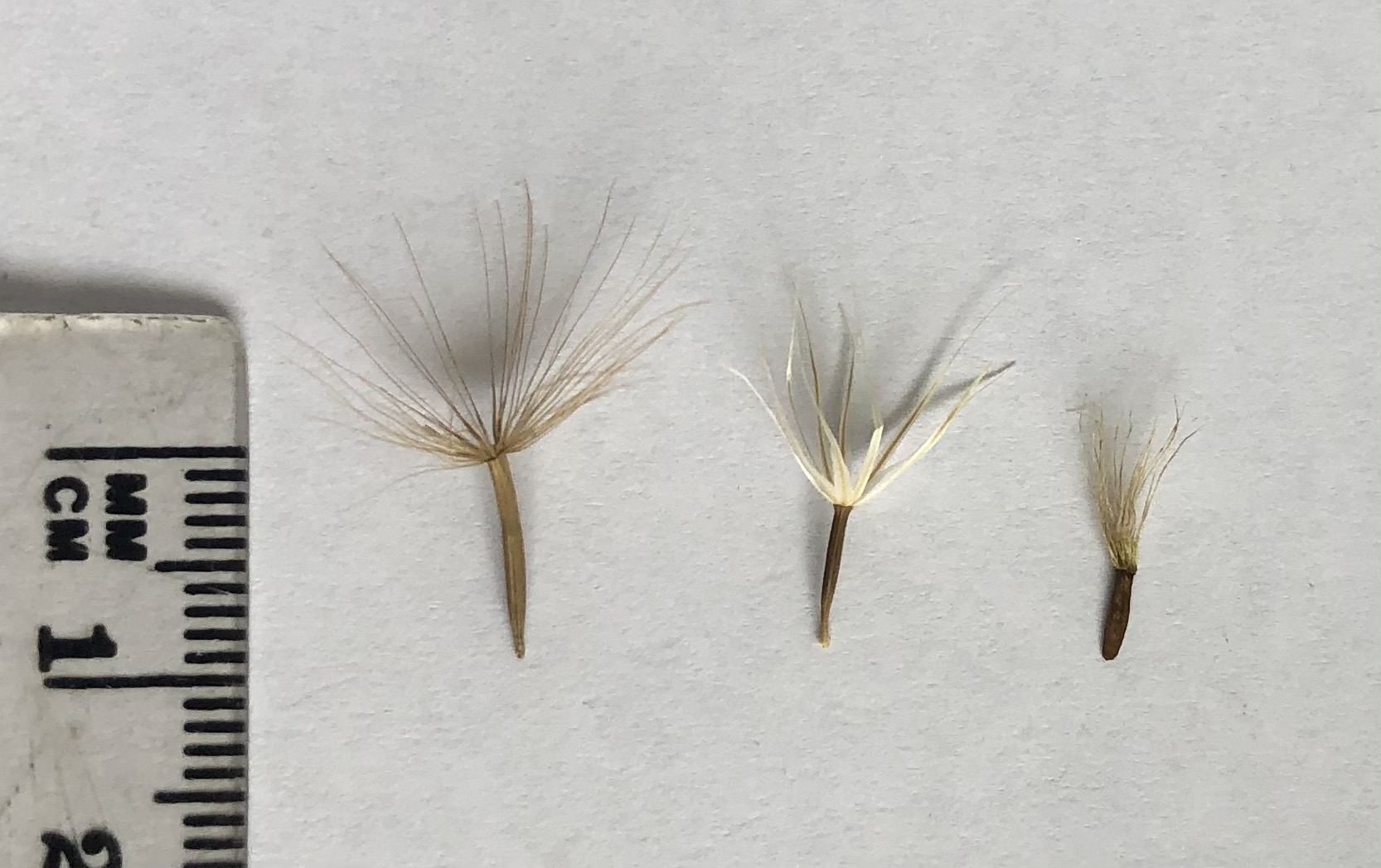
Seed comparison, from left to right: Microseris scapigera, Microseris walteri and Microseris lanceolata

== Uses ==
Plants of Microseris scapigera sensu have no tubers, but roots that are "fleshy, only slightly fibrous, and slightly, but tolerably bitter when eaten raw". Indigenous Australians may have eaten this plant also, but historical sources describe murnong as a sweet tuber. The bitterness in Microseris scapigera roots can be removed by blanching the roots in boiling water for 5 minutes, before consumption or further cooking.

Aboriginal populations in southeastern Australia relied on tubers of the daisy yam as a staple, and actively cultivated it. It is known as ngampa in the Thura-Yura languages.
