= Ozone (paddle steamer) =

Paddle steamer built in Scotland in 1886

- Ozone passing Pile Light, Port Phillip c. 1910

History
- Name: Ozone
- Operator: Bay Excursion Company
- Builder: Napier, Shanks & Bell, Glasgow

General characteristics
- Type: Paddle steamer
- Tonnage: 572
- Length: 260 ft (79 m)
- Beam: 28 ft (8.5 m)
- Height: 10.6 ft (3.2 m)
- Speed: 17 knots

Ozone was a ship built in 1886 near Glasgow, in Scotland. It could exceed 17 knots (31 km/h; 20 mph) and is regarded as one of the finest paddle steamers ever built.

The Ozone was commissioned by the Bay Excursion Company and relocated to Australia, becoming a great favourite on Port Phillip Bay, in Victoria, and remained in service there for many years.

== History ==
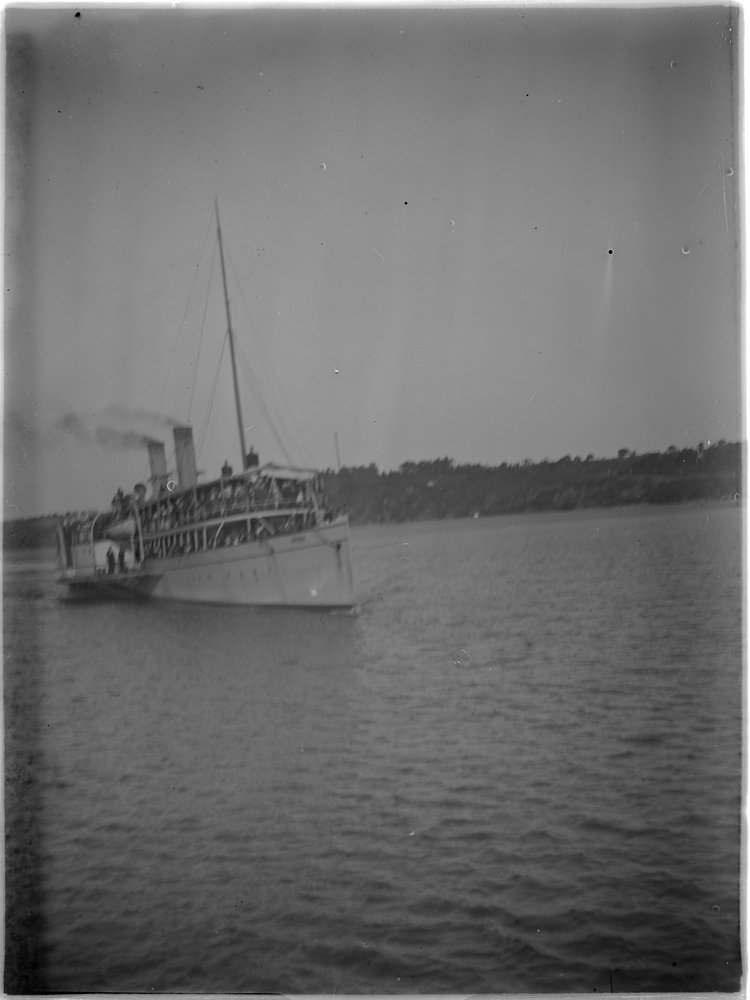
Paddle steamer Ozone on Port Phillip Bay, c. 1900

The wreckage of the Ozone at Indented Head, late 1920s

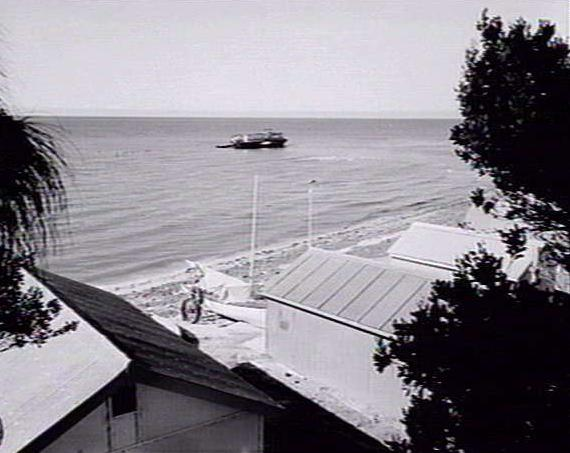
The wreckage of the Ozone offshore of Indented Head, 1955

The first bay excursion of the Ozone was on 18 December 1886, when she commenced a run between Melbourne and Queenscliff. On arrival she collided with the pier at Queenscliff.

In 1889, the Ozone was involved in a collision with the vessel Elfin, in Hobsons Bay, near Williamstown.

In 1894, she was involved in another collision, with the vessel May, in Port Phillip Bay.

The Ozone was withdrawn from service in 1918 and was sold to Melbourne shipbreaker J. Hill in March 1925. In October 1925 she was dismantled and her hull was sunk off-shore at Indented Head to form a breakwater for small craft.

The wreck is gradually eroding away. In April 1991, the starboard paddle wheel collapsed, dramatically changing the configuration of the remains. One of Ozone's two anchors has been incorporated into an historical monument, which stands on the cliff-top near Taylor Reserve, Indented Head, overlooking the wreck.

== Dive location ==
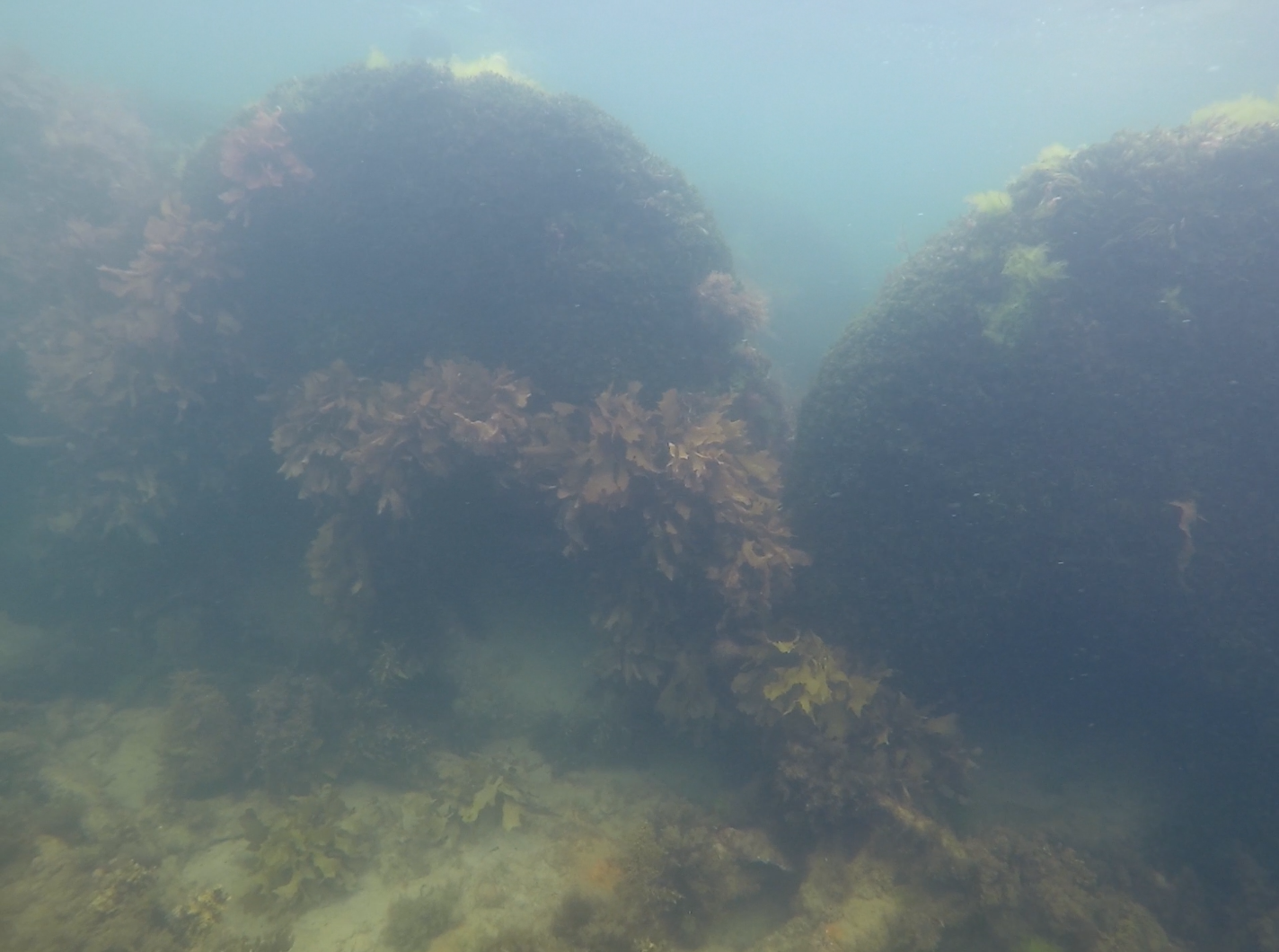
Boiler of the paddle steamer Ozone, January 2019

The wreckage of the Ozone remains visible about 50 metres offshore at Indented Head and is an easy shallow dive.
