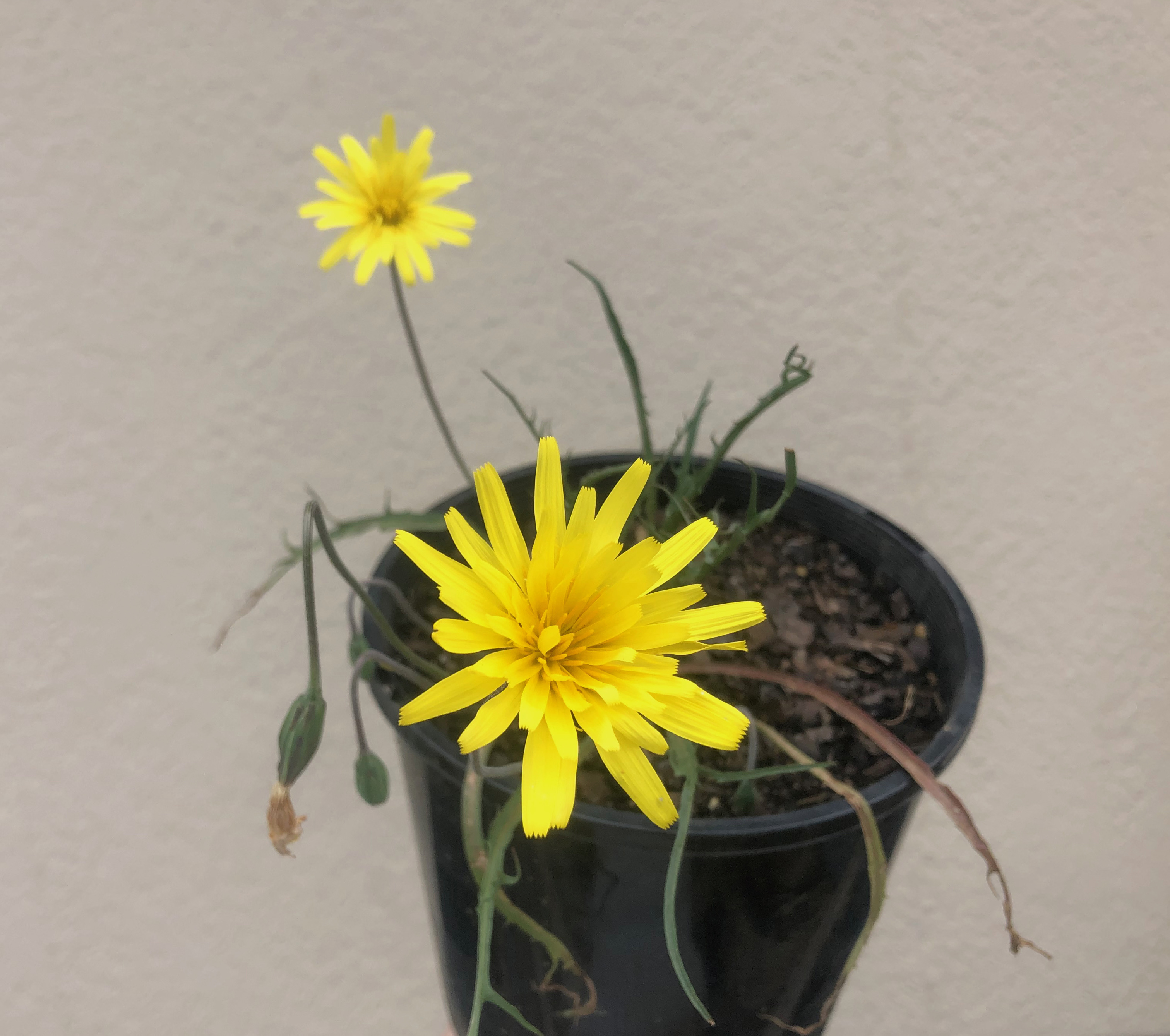

Scientific classification
- Kingdom: Plantae
- Clade: Embryophytes
- Clade: Tracheophytes
- Clade: Angiosperms
- Clade: Eudicots
- Clade: Asterids
- Order: Asterales
- Family: Asteraceae
- Genus: Microseris
- Species: M. walteri

Binomial name
- Microseris walteri Gand.

Synonyms
- Microseris sp. 3; Microseris aff. lanceolata (Foothills)

= Microseris walteri =

Species of plant

Microseris walteri is an Australian perennial herb with yellow flowers and edible tuberous roots, and one of three plants known as murnong or yam daisy along with Microseris scapigera and Microseris lanceolata.

The plant is found in southern parts of Australia, including Victoria, NSW, ACT, SA, WA and Tasmania. In Victoria, the plant is widespread and occupies a wide range of habitats, particularly dry open forest.

== Botanical naming ==
For more than 30 years Murnong was named as Microseris sp. or Microseris lanceolata or Microseris scapigera. Royal Botanic Gardens Victoria botanist Neville Walsh clarified the botanical name of Microseris walteri in 2016 and defined the differences in the three species in the table below.

Feature	M. walteri	M. lanceolata	M. scapigera
Roots	single fleshy root expanding to a solitary, napiform to narrow-ellipsoid or narrow-ovoid, annually replaced tuber	several fleshy roots, cylindrical to long-tapered, branching just below ground-level	several cylindrical or long-tapered, usually branched shortly below leaves
Fruit (Capsela)	usually less than 7mm long	usually less than 7mm long	mostly 7–10 mm long
Pappus bristles	c. 10 mm long, 0.5–1.3mm wide at base	10–20 mm long, c. 0.3–0.5 mm wide at base	30–66 mm long
Joined petals (Ligule)	usually more than 15mm long	usually more than 15mm long	up to 12mm long
Origin	lowlands of temperate southern WA, SA, NSW, ACT, Victoria and Tasmania	rarely on basalt soils; alpine and subalpine NSW, ACT and Victoria	mostly from basalt plains of western Victoria and elevated sites in Tasmania
Taste of roots	sweet-tasting, both raw and cooked	bitter, slightly fibrous and not particularly palatable	slightly fibrous, and slightly, but tolerably bitter

== Biological descriptions ==
Microseris walteri has the form of a tufted rosette of toothed lanceolate leaves.

The flower appears in Spring, which is a yellow head of florets, similar to flatweed (Hypochaeris radicata) or dandelion (Taraxacum). The flower stalk is pendulous before flowering, becoming erect for flowering to attract pollinators and again with the ripening of the seed head. The seed heads ripen to a cluster of fluffy, tan achenes, each having a crown of fine extensions called a pappus. The seeds are dispersed by wind.

The plant usually grows a single tuber each season. There is a wide variation in shape and size of tubers between plants from different habitats in the Victoria. Those from northwest Victoria have probably the longest tubers. A rare form from the volcanic plain (Woorndoo area) has a stocky, sometimes few-branched, but apparently perennial tap-root.

== Gallery ==
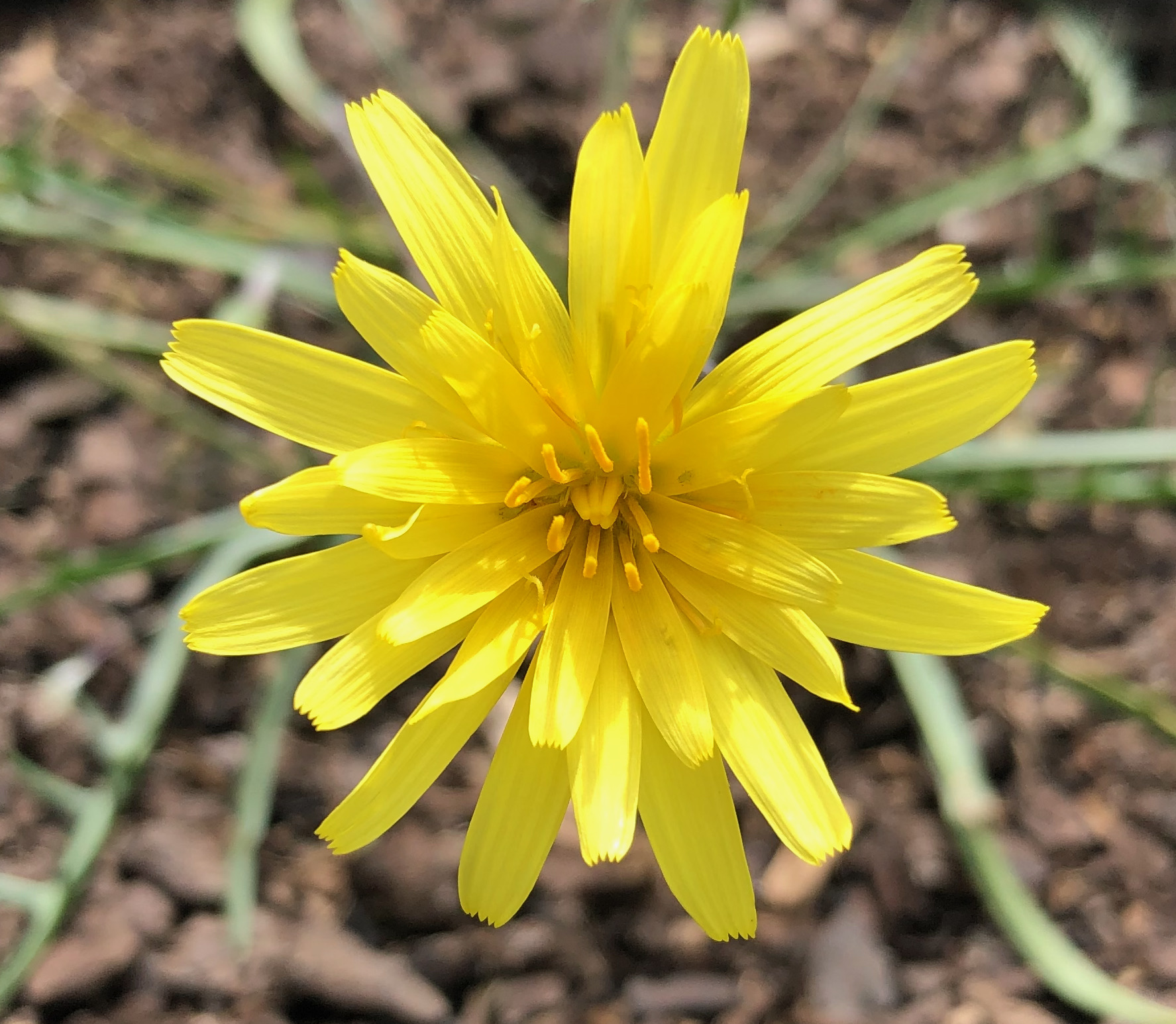
Microseris walteri flower

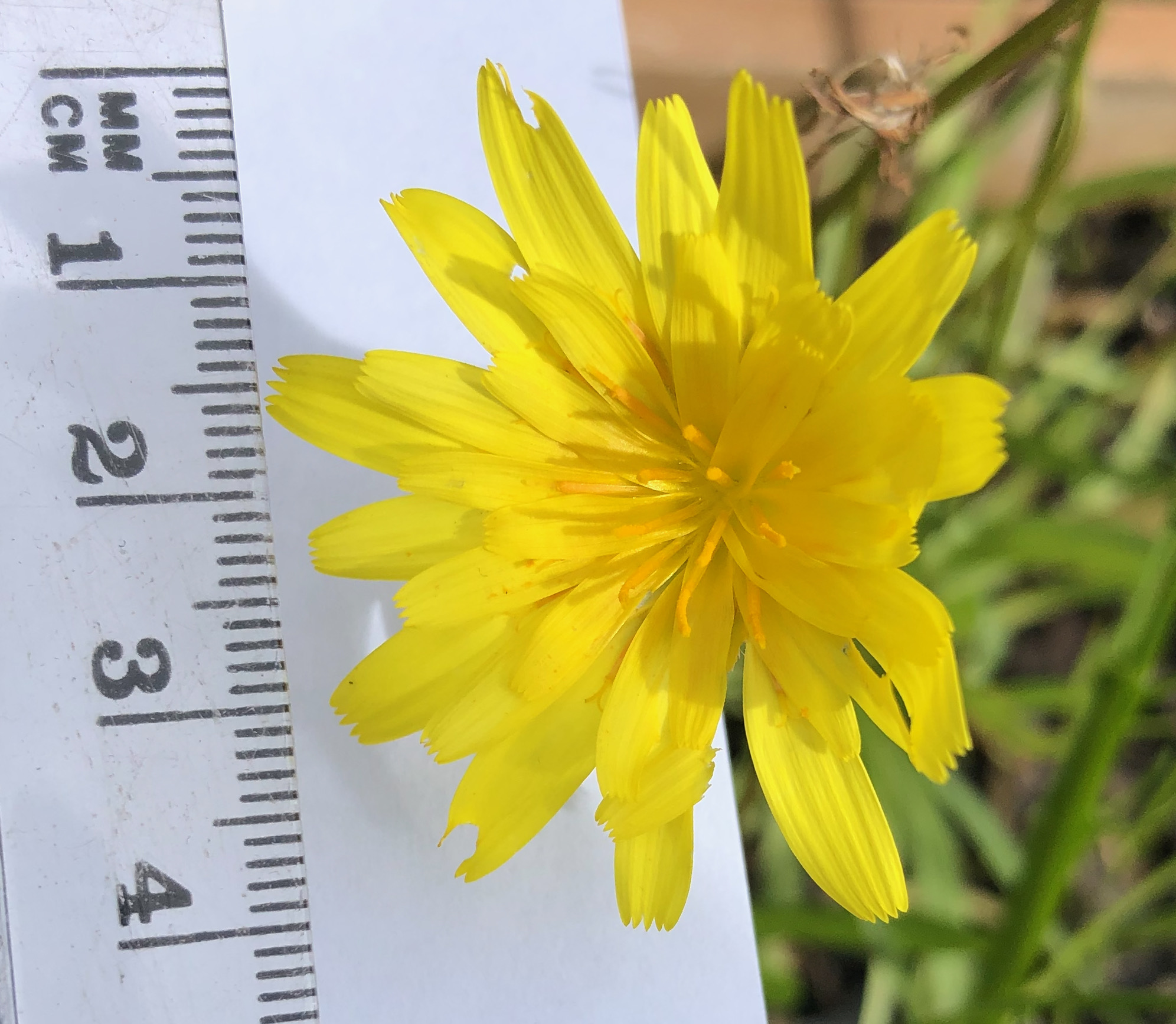
Flower measurement

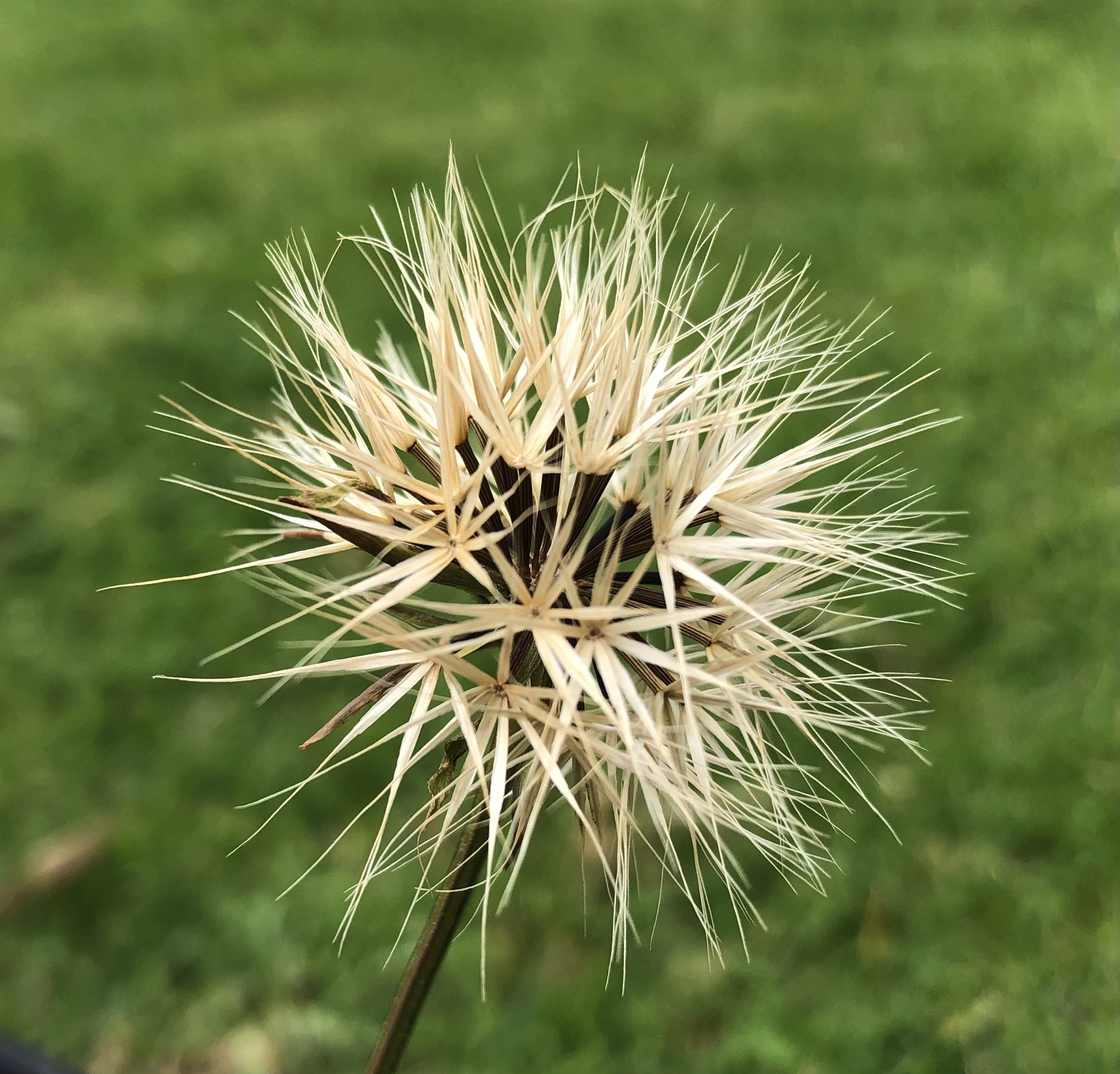
Seed clock

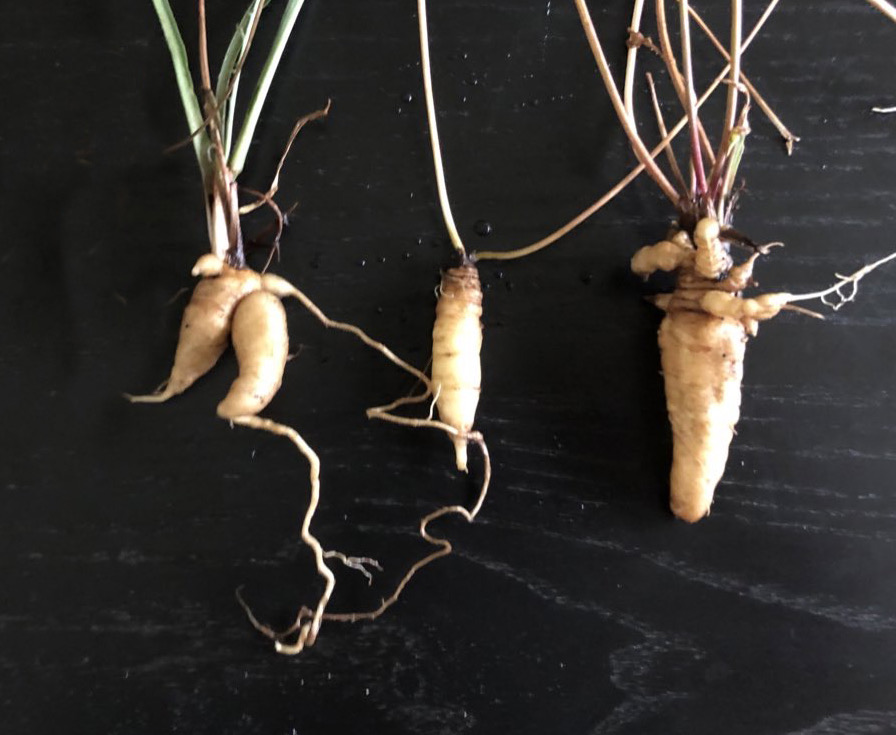
Roots

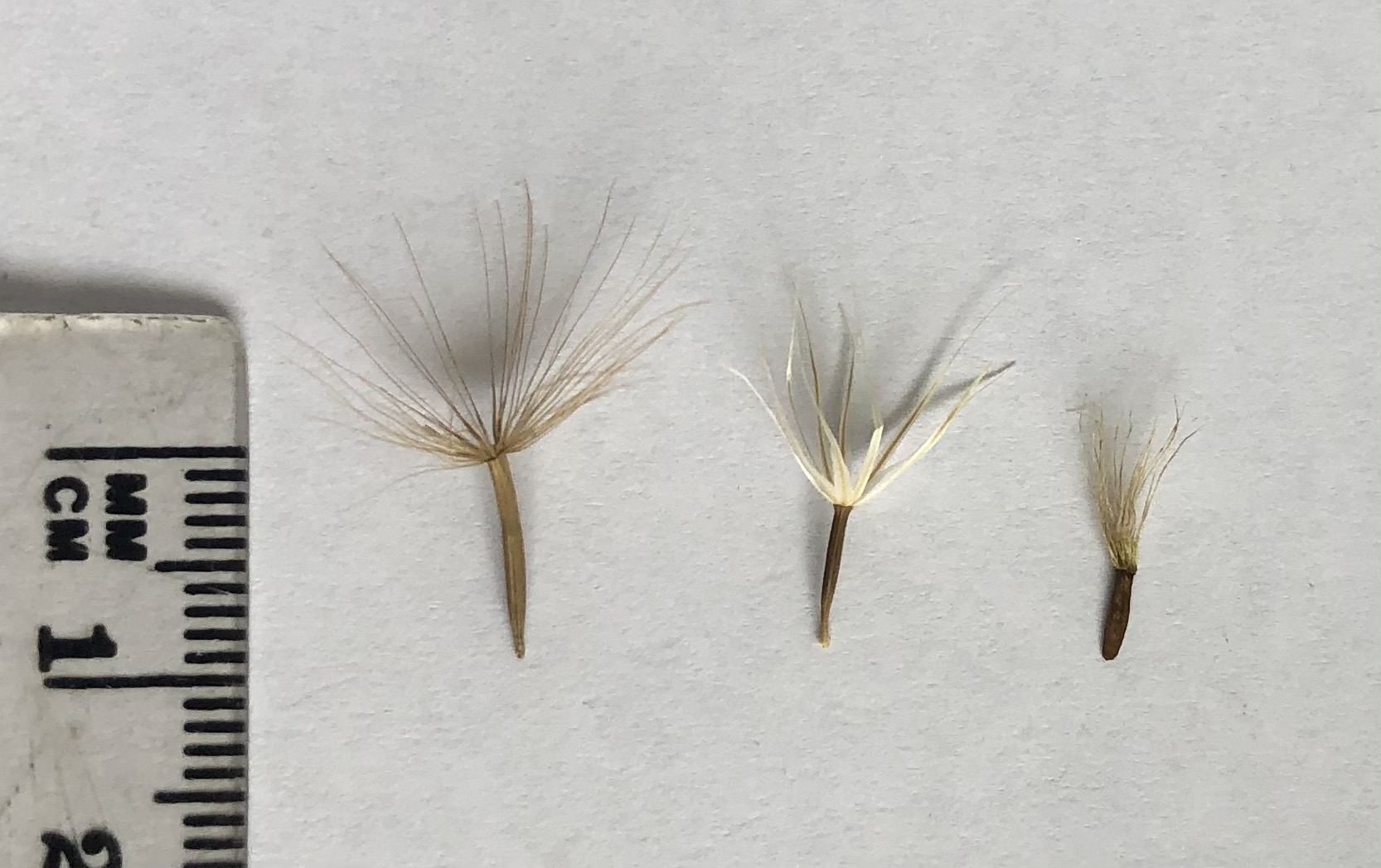
Seed comparison, from left to right: Microseris scapigera, Microseris walteri and Microseris lanceolata

== Cultivation and uses ==
The edible tuberous roots of murnong plants were once a vitally important source of food for the Indigenous Australians. In the south-eastern parts of Australia, Indigenous women would dig for roots with a digging stick, also known as a yam stick, and they would carry the roots in a dillybag. The practice of digging for tubers and leaving part of the tuber, meant the soil was tilled and caused more plants to grow. Murnong was cooked by placing a dillybag of tubers onto an earth oven for roasting. The taste of the cooked tuber is described as 'sweet with a flavour of coconut'.

The introduction of cattle, sheep and goats by immigrating early–colonialist Europeans led to the near extinction of murnong, with calamitous results for first Australians' communities who depended upon murnong for a large part of their food.
