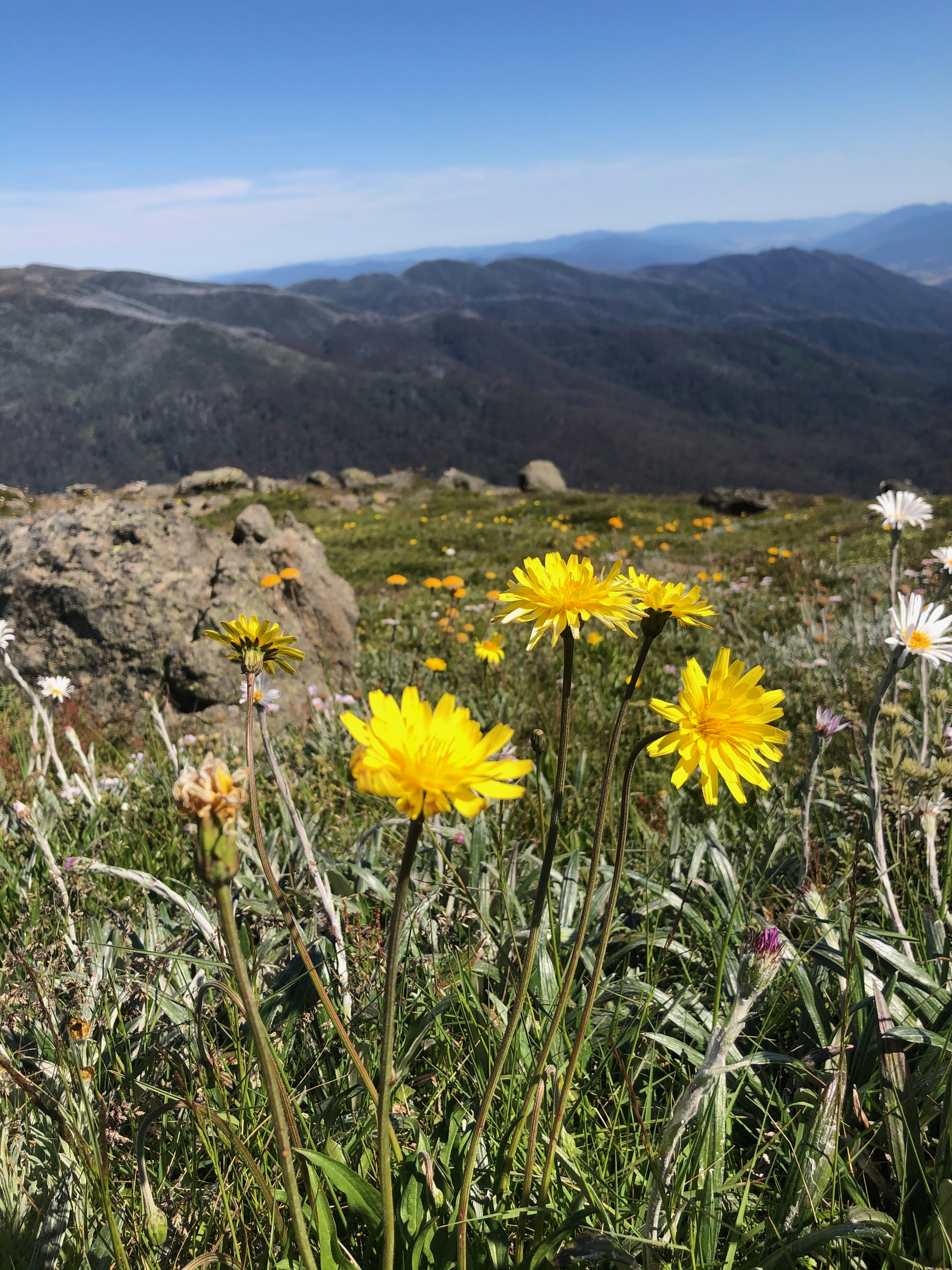

Scientific classification
- Kingdom: Plantae
- Clade: Embryophytes
- Clade: Tracheophytes
- Clade: Angiosperms
- Clade: Eudicots
- Clade: Asterids
- Order: Asterales
- Family: Asteraceae
- Genus: Microseris
- Species: M. lanceolata

Binomial name
- Microseris lanceolata (Walp.) Sch.Bip.

Synonyms
- Galasia lanoeolata Sch.Bip.; Galasia scapigera Sch.Bip.; Krigia chilensis Nees; Krigia pinnatifida Bertero ex DC.; Krigia pusilla DC.; Microseris pygmaea Raoul nom. illeg.; Phyllopappus lanceolatus Walp.

= Microseris lanceolata =

Species of plant

Microseris lanceolata is an Australian alpine herb with yellow flowers and one of three plants known as murnong or yam daisy along with Microseris scapigera and Microseris walteri.

The plant is found in southern parts of Australia, including Victoria, NSW and ACT. In Victoria, the plant is confined to alpine and subalpine herbfields of the eastern ranges, and often locally plentiful. Microseris walteri and Microseris scapigera are found in lower altitude areas.

Commercial plant nurseries will often mislabel a Microseris scapigera plant with the name of Microseris lanceolata, because the binomial name was only clarified in recent years. Literature about Murnong often misidentifies Microseris lanceolata as having a sweet-tasting tuber, but this refers to the Microseris walteri plant.

== Botanical naming ==
For more than 30 years murnong was named as Microseris sp. or Microseris lanceolata or Microseris scapigera. Royal Botanic Gardens Victoria botanist Neville Walsh clarified the botanical name of Microseris walteri in 2016 and defined the differences in the three species in the table below.

Feature	M. walteri	M. lanceolata	M. scapigera
Roots	single fleshy root expanding to a solitary, napiform to narrow-ellipsoid or narrow-ovoid, annually replaced tuber	several fleshy roots, cylindrical to long-tapered, branching just below ground-level	several cylindrical or long-tapered, usually branched shortly below leaves
Fruit (capsela)	usually less than 7 mm long	usually less than 7 mm long	mostly 7–10 mm long
Pappus bristles	c. 10 mm long, 0.5–1.3 mm wide at base	10–20 mm long, c. 0.3–0.5 mm wide at base	30–66 mm long
Joined petals (ligule)	usually more than 15 mm long	usually more than 15 mm long	up to 12 mm long
Origin	lowlands of temperate southern WA, SA, NSW, ACT, Victoria and Tasmania	rarely on basalt soils; alpine and subalpine NSW, ACT and Victoria	mostly from basalt plains of western Victoria and elevated sites in Tasmania
Taste of roots	sweet-tasting, both raw and cooked	bitter, slightly fibrous and not particularly palatable	slightly fibrous, and slightly, but tolerably bitter

== Biological descriptions ==
Microseris lanceolata has the form of a tufted rosette of toothed lanceolate leaves.

The flower is a yellow head of florets, similar to flatweed (Hypochaeris radicata) or dandelion (Taraxacum). In its natural alpine and subalpine environment, the flower begins to blossom in December when the temperature reaches about 20 °C. The flower stalk is pendulous before flowering, becoming erect for flowering to attract pollinators and again with the ripening of the seed head. The seed heads ripen to a cluster of fluffy, tan achenes, each having a crown of fine extensions called a pappus. The seeds are dispersed by wind.

The plant has several fleshy roots branching just below ground level, rather than a tuber like Microseris walteri.

== Cultivation and uses ==
The edible tuberous roots of murnong plants were an important source of food for some Aboriginal Australian peoples. However, the descriptions of murnong are more closely aligned with Microseris walteri. To add to the confusion, commercial nurseries will commonly mislabel a Microseris scapigera plant as Microseris lanceolata.

== Gallery ==
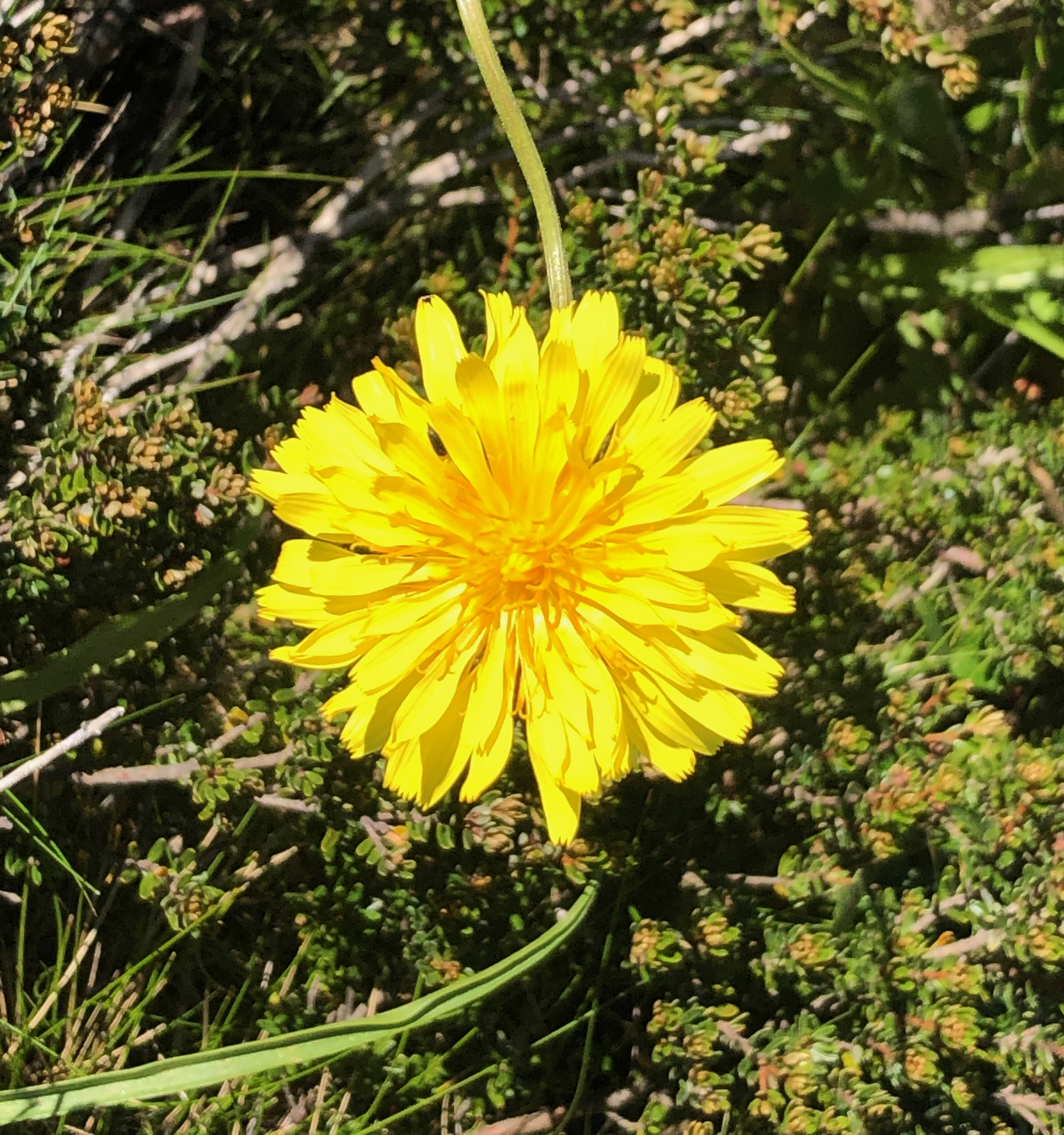
Microseris lanceolata flower, approximately 5cm wide

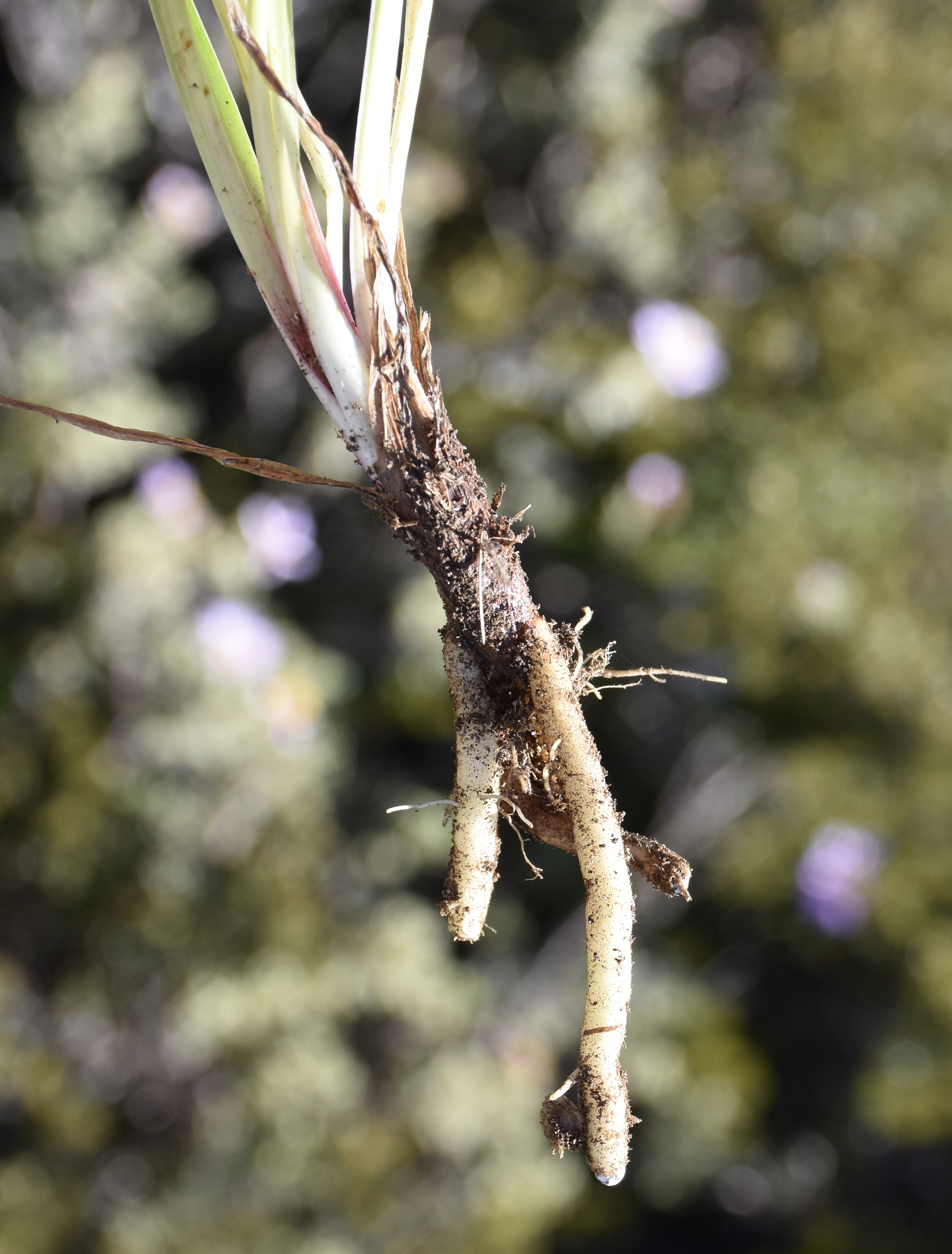
Microseris lanceolata roots, branching just below ground-level

Murnong seed clock

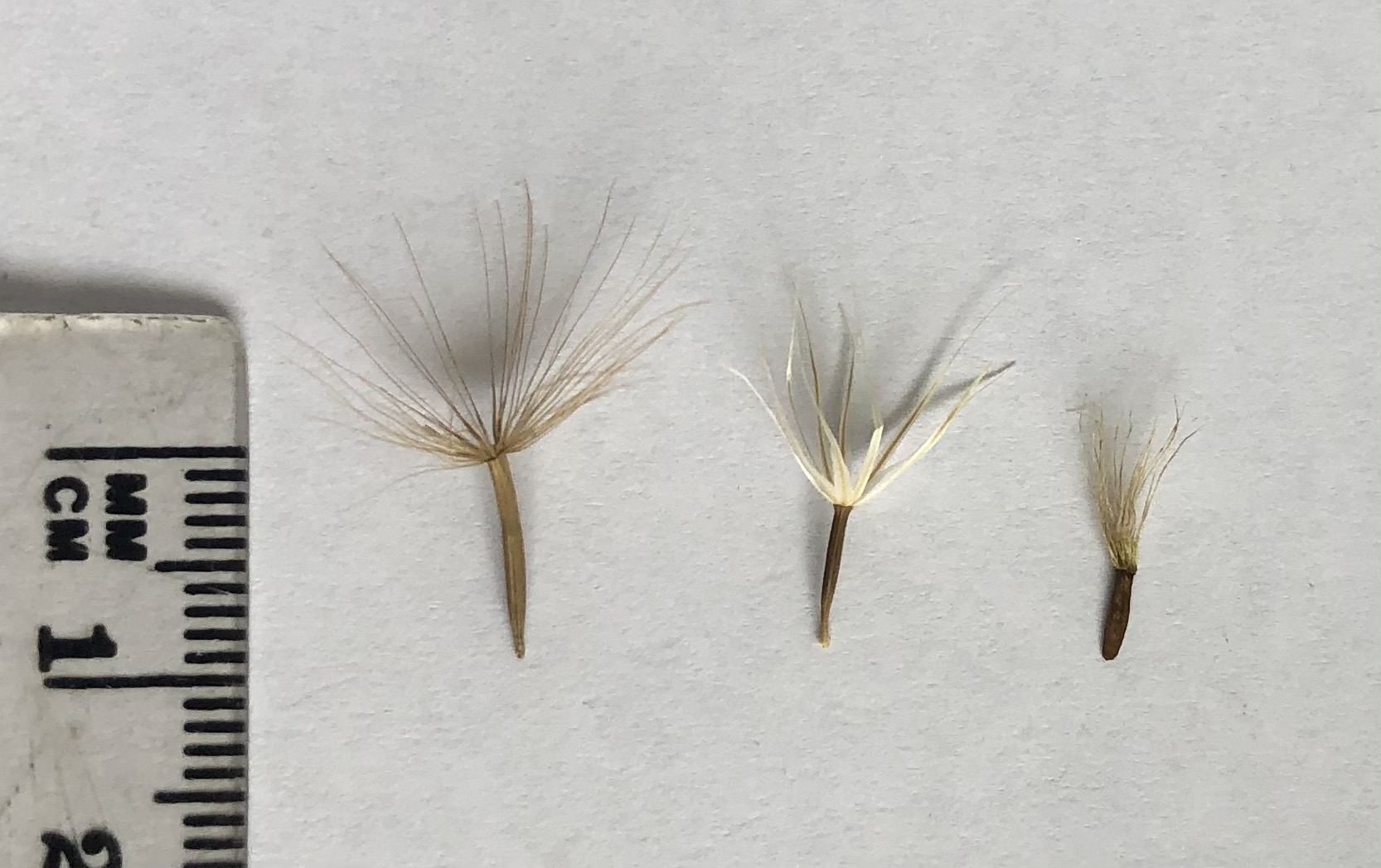
Seed comparison, from left to right: Microseris scapigera, Microseris walteri and Microseris lanceolata
