= Digging stick =

Primitive wooden implement

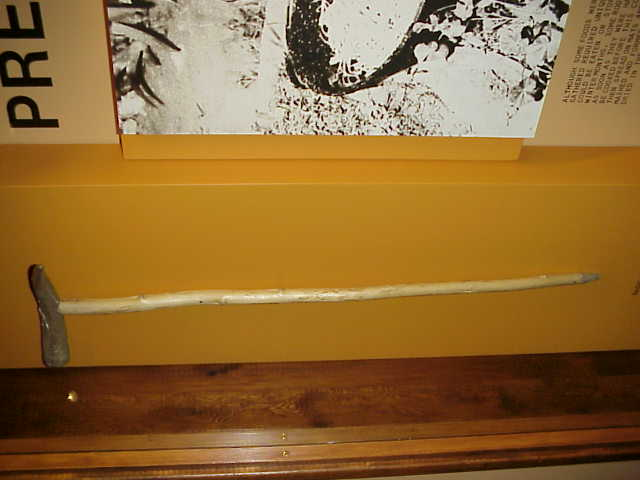
A digging stick of the Pacific Northwest coast

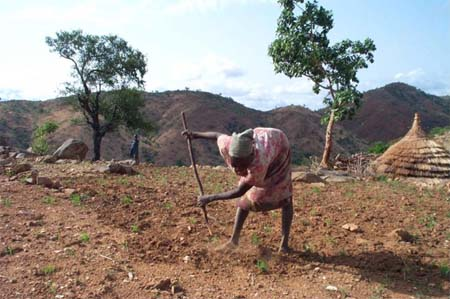
Nuba person farming in the Nuba Mountains, Sudan

A digging stick, sometimes called a yam stick, is a wooden implement used primarily by subsistence-based cultures to dig out underground food such as roots and tubers, tilling the soil, or burrowing animals and anthills. It is a term used in archaeology and anthropology to describe similar implements, which usually consists of little more than a sturdy stick which has been shaped or sharpened and sometimes hardened by being placed temporarily in a fire.

Fashioned with handles for pulling or pushing, it forms a prehistoric plough, and is also described as a type of hoe. Digging sticks more than 170,000 years old, made of boxwood by Neanderthals, have been found in Italy.

== By region ==
=== Americas ===
In Mexico and the Mesoamerican region, the digging stick was the most important agricultural tool throughout the region.

The coa stick normally flares out into a triangle at the end and is used for cultivating maize. It is still used for agriculture in some indigenous communities, with some newer 20th-century versions having the addition of a little metal tip.

Other digging sticks, according to Native Americans of the Columbia Plateau, have been used since time immemorial to gather edible roots like balsamroot, bitterroot, camas, and varieties of biscuitroot. Typical digging sticks were and are still about 2 to 3 feet in length, usually slightly arched, with the bottom tip shaved off at an angle. A 5 to 8 inch cross-piece made of antler, bone, or wood was fitted perpendicularly over the top of the stick, allowing the use of two hands to drive the tool into the ground. Since contact with Europeans in the 19th century, Native Americans have also adapted the use of metal in making digging sticks.

=== Asia-Pacific ===
==== China ====
The Chinese call the digging stick "lei"(耒), which is said to have been invented by Shennong. The most primitive lei had only one prong, while improved versions often had two prongs. "lei" is often mentioned together with "si" (耜，push hoe) as the most primitive agricultural tool in China.

==== Australia ====
Digging sticks are used by many of the Aboriginal peoples of Australia, for digging up roots and tubers and for ceremonial use.

The Gunditjmara people of western Victoria used digging sticks, also known as "yam sticks", for digging yams, goannas, ants and other foods out of the ground, as well as for defence, for settling disputes and for punishment purposes as part of customary law.

==== New Guinea ====
The Kuman people east-central New Guinea were horticulturists who used basic tools such as the digging stick, wooden hoe, and wooden spade in their daily lives. Eventually they started to use more sophisticated tools such as iron spades and pick-axes.

Two main types of digging sticks both shared a similar shape but differed in size:

- A larger and heavier digging stick with a diameter of about 4 cm (1.6 in) and 2 m (6 ft 7 in) in length, used for the purpose of turning over the soil surface for new gardens; and
- A smaller and lighter digging stick with a diameter of about 2 cm (0.79 in) and 1 m (3 ft 3 in) (or less) in length, mainly used for basic horticulture tasks.

==== Polynesia ====
Samoans have two types of digging sticks: a regular ʻoso with a sharpened wood or metal end to loosen and till land before planting, and an ʻoso tō with a blunt end to bore holes for planting.

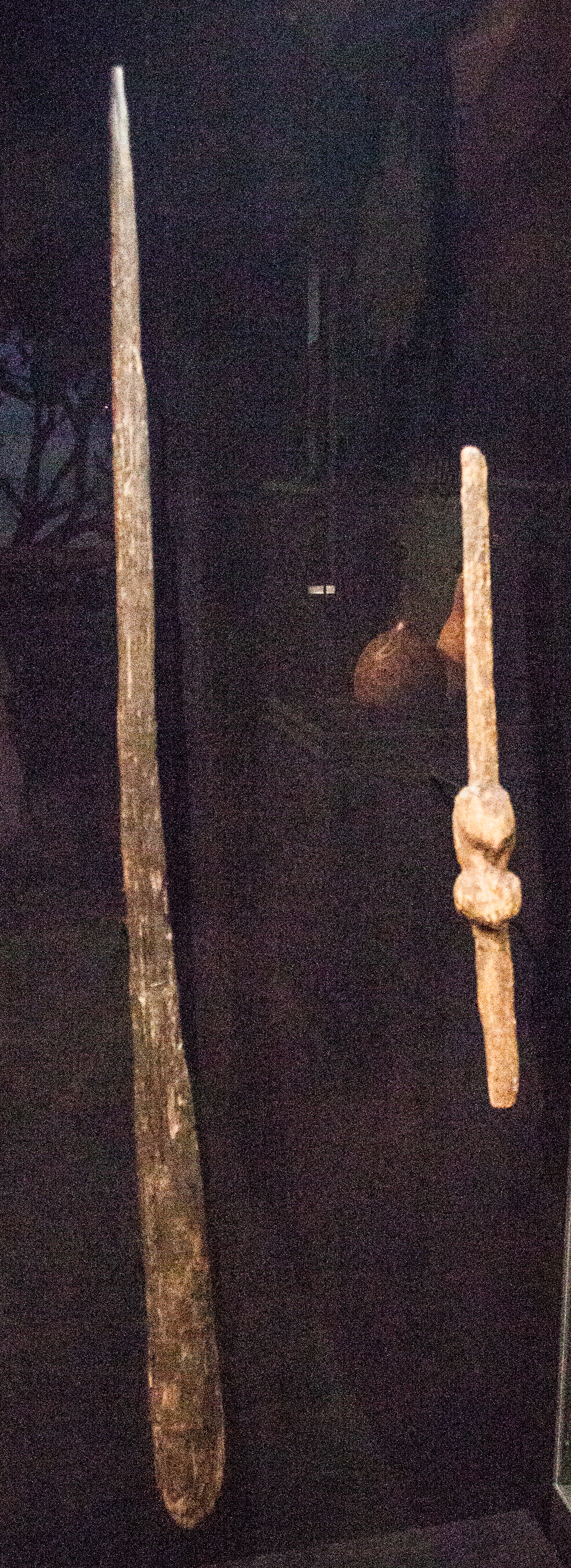
A Māori digging stick

The Māori people of New Zealand possess kō 2–3 m (6 ft 7 in – 9 ft 10 in) long made of strong and long-lasting wood, with one end fashioned into a narrow blade and a footrest tied to the shaft close by. They were used for tilling soil ready for planting tubers, as well as for digging for roots or tubers, and in ceremonial use. Kō often have carved crescent shaped heads associating its purpose as a tool for planting the staple sweet potato (kūmara) to periods to do so in the waning of a lunar month (mārama).

In Hawaii, the ‘o‘o is further used in groundbreaking ceremonies.

=== East Africa ===
==== Ethiopia ====
The most common digging stick found in Ethiopia is the ankassay in Amharic, a Semitic language spoken in Ethiopia and the second-most spoken Semitic language in the world. The ankassay is a single shaft that is about 4–5 feet in length with a socket-hafted pointed iron blade as the tip.

Two other digging sticks are unique to the Harar region located in East-Central Ethiopia, which are considered to be unusual due to their function beyond the basic use of other digging sticks, and the use of one as a plough.

The deungora is a particularly long digging stick, which is about 110 centimetres, or approximately 3.6 feet, in length with a socket-hafted pointed iron blade as the tip. What's unique about this digging stick is that a bored stone, about 15 centimetres in diameter, is attached at the opposing end. This stone shares the same form as other bored stones that have been discovered in archaeological sites in Africa.

Maresha is the Gurage name, also the same word used by the Amhara, for a digging stick that differs in construction because of its forked form. It is used primarily to dig holes for construction, planting, and harvesting roots and tubers. This tool is used as a plow to turn over the soil of an entire field before planting. It is used to break clods of soil in areas where the soil is hard or in areas that may be too steep for ploughing, and to dig holes for construction or to transplant domestic plants. When compared to the ankassay, this digging stick can perform the same duties and in addition can be used as a hoe.
