= History of Melbourne =

The history of Melbourne details the city's growth from a fledgling settlement into a modern commercial and financial centre as Australia's second largest city, Melbourne, in the state of Victoria.

== Pre-European settlement ==
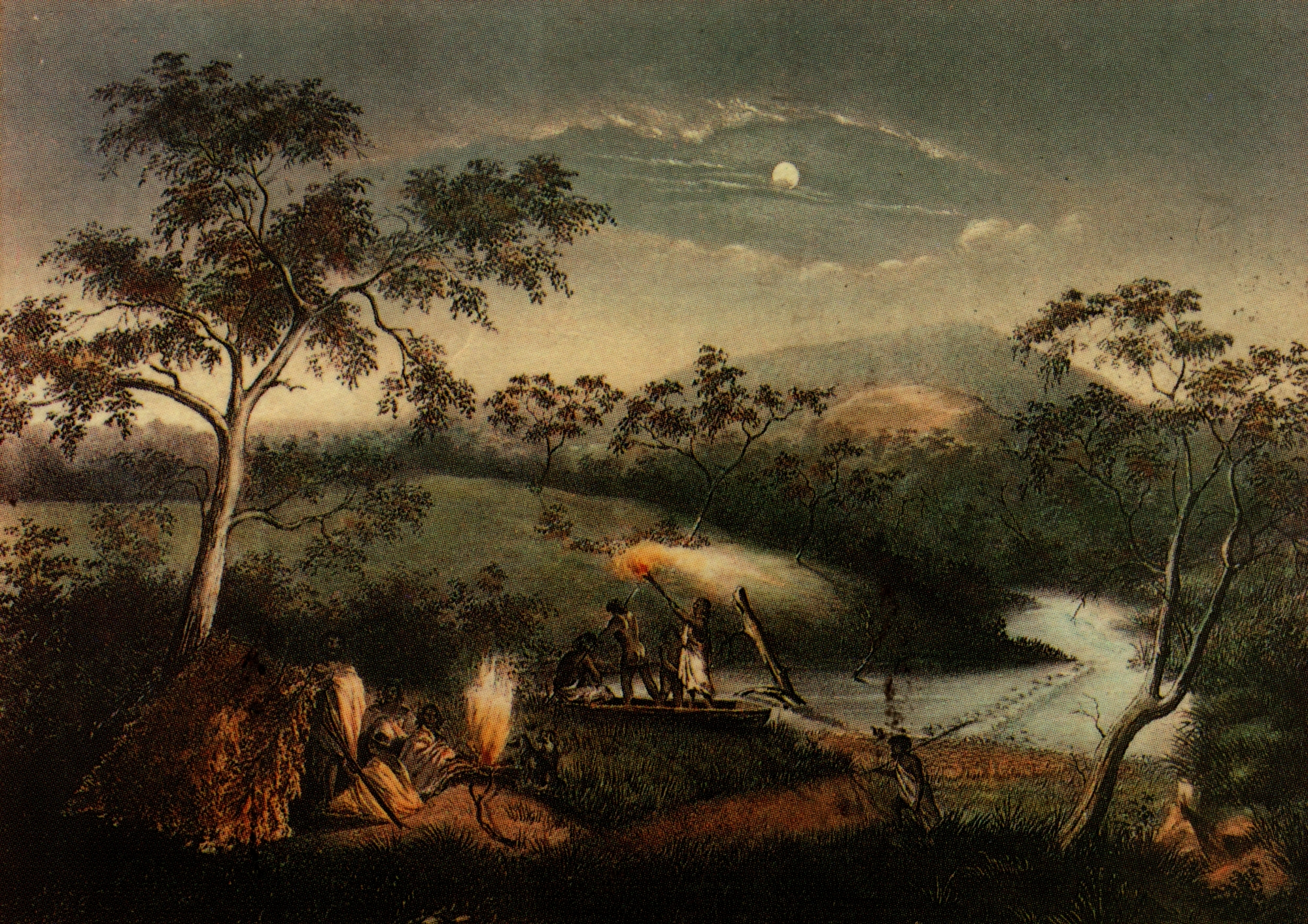
Aborigines on Merri Creek by Charles Troedel

The area around Port Phillip and the Yarra valley, on which the city of Melbourne now stands, was the home of the Kulin nation, an alliance of several language groups of Aboriginal Australians, whose ancestors had lived in the area for an estimated 31,000 to 40,000 years. At the time of European settlement the population of Indigenous inhabitants of what is now Victoria was estimated to be under 20,000, drawn from three peoples: the Wurundjeri, Boonwurrung (Bunurong) and Wathaurong.

The area was an important meeting place for the clans of the Kulin, as well as a vital source of food, water and a sheltered Bay Area for clan meetings and annual events. The Kulin lived by fishing, hunting and gathering, and made a good living from the rich food sources of Port Phillip and the surrounding grasslands.

Many of the Aboriginal people who live in Melbourne today are descended from Aboriginal groups from other parts of Victoria and Australia. However, there are still people who identify as Wurundjeri and Bunurong descendants of the original people who occupied the area of Melbourne prior to European settlement. While there are few overt signs of the Aboriginal past in the Melbourne area, there are a wealth of sites of cultural and spiritual significance.

In June 2021, the boundaries between the land of two of the traditional owner groups, the Wurundjeri and Bunurong, were agreed after being drawn up by the Victorian Aboriginal Heritage Council. The borderline runs across the city from west to east, with the CBD, Richmond and Hawthorn included in Wurundjeri land, and Albert Park, St Kilda and Caulfield on Bunurong land.

== Arrival of the penal colony ==
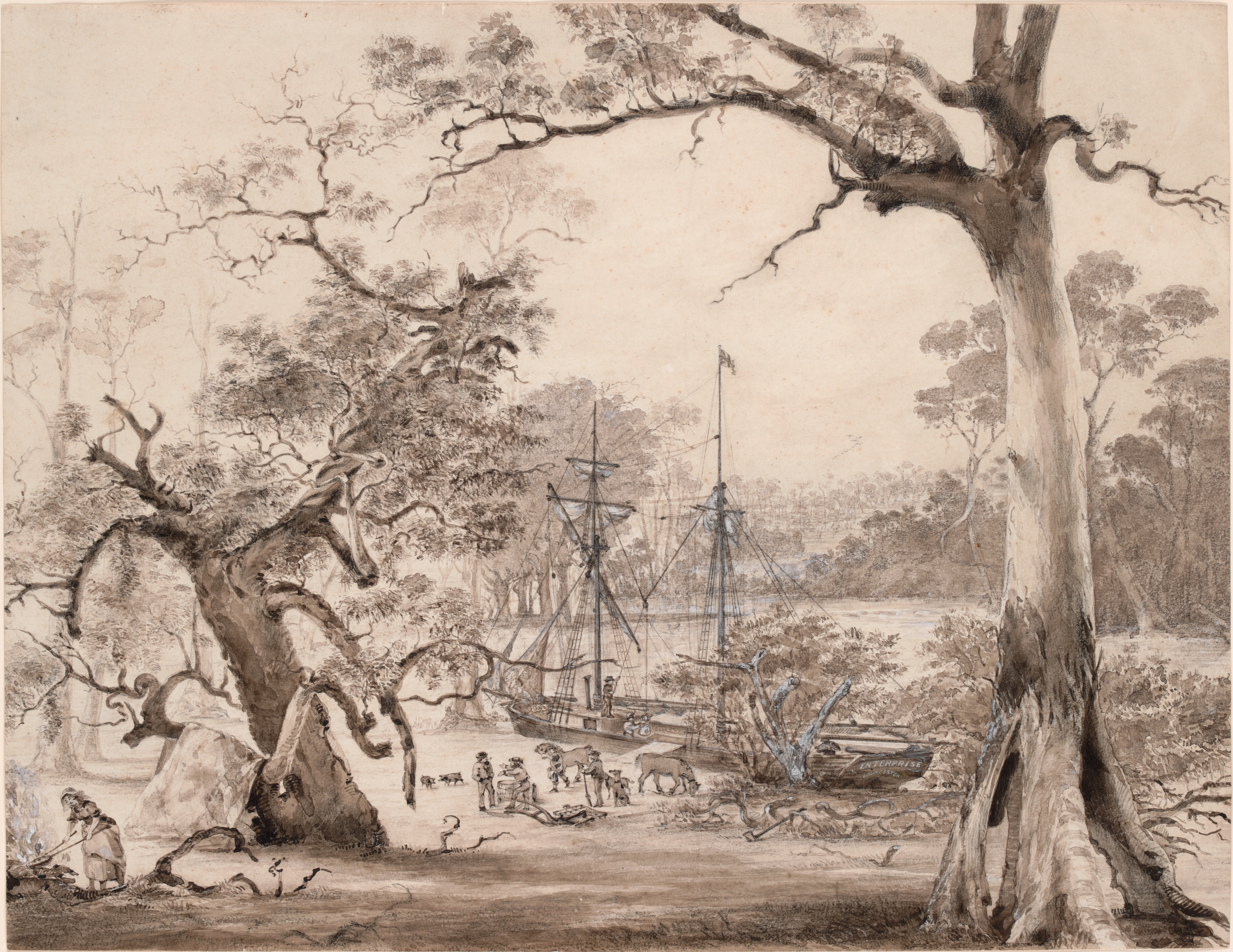
The Enterprize, the ship of John Pascoe Fawkner landing at Melbourne

In 1797 George Bass, in an open whaleboat with a crew of six, was the first European to enter what came to be called Bass Strait, the passage between the Australian mainland and Van Diemen's Land (Tasmania). He sailed westwards along what is now the coast of the Gippsland region of Victoria, as far west as Western Port. In 1802, John Murray in the Lady Nelson entered Port Phillip to conduct early mappings and exploration of the region, and he was followed shortly after by Matthew Flinders.

In 1803, Charles Grimes, the deputy surveyor-general of New South Wales, was sent to Port Phillip to survey the area. Sailing on Cumberland, under the command of Acting Lieutenant Charles Robbins, the party entered Port Phillip on 20 January 1803. On 30 January, Grimes and his party landed at Frankston and met around thirty of the local inhabitants. A plaque at the site marks the event. On 2 February, he entered the mouth of the Yarra River. On the next day, Grimes rowed up the river in a boat and explored what is now the Maribyrnong River for several miles. Returning to the Yarra he explored the river for several miles until he reached Dights Falls on 8 February. The journal of another member of the party, James Flemming, has been preserved, and in it he several times refers to finding good soil. Although it was evidently a dry season Flemming, who was described by King as "very intelligent", thought from the appearance of the herbage that "there is not often so great a scarcity of water as at present". He suggested that the "most eligible place for a settlement I have seen is on the Freshwater (Yarra) River". Grimes returned to Sydney on 7 March 1803 and, in spite of Flemming's opinions, reported adversely against a settlement at Port Phillip.

Later in 1803 the British Governor of New South Wales, Captain Philip Gidley King, fearful that the French might try to occupy the Bass Strait area, sent Colonel David Collins with a party of 300 convicts to establish a settlement at Port Phillip. Collins arrived at the site of Sorrento, on the Mornington Peninsula, in October 1803, but was put off by the lack of fresh water. In May 1804 Collins moved the settlement to Tasmania, establishing Hobart. The northern shores of Bass Strait were then left to a few whalers and sealers. Among the convicts at Sorrento was a boy called John Pascoe Fawkner, who would later come back to settle in the Melbourne area.

In 1824 Hamilton Hume and William Hovell came overland from New South Wales, failing to find Western Port, their destination, but instead reaching Corio Bay, where they found good grazing land. But it was another ten years before Edward Henty, a Tasmanian grazier, established an illegal sheep-run on crown land at Portland, in what is now western Victoria, in 1834.

John Batman, a successful farmer in northern Tasmania, also desired more grazing land. He entered Port Phillip Bay on 29 May 1835, landing at Indented Head. Over the next week, he explored the area around the Bay, first at Corio Bay, near the present site of Geelong, and later moving up the Yarra and Maribyrnong rivers at the north of the Bay. He explored a large area in what is now the northern suburbs of Melbourne.

== Foundation of town ==
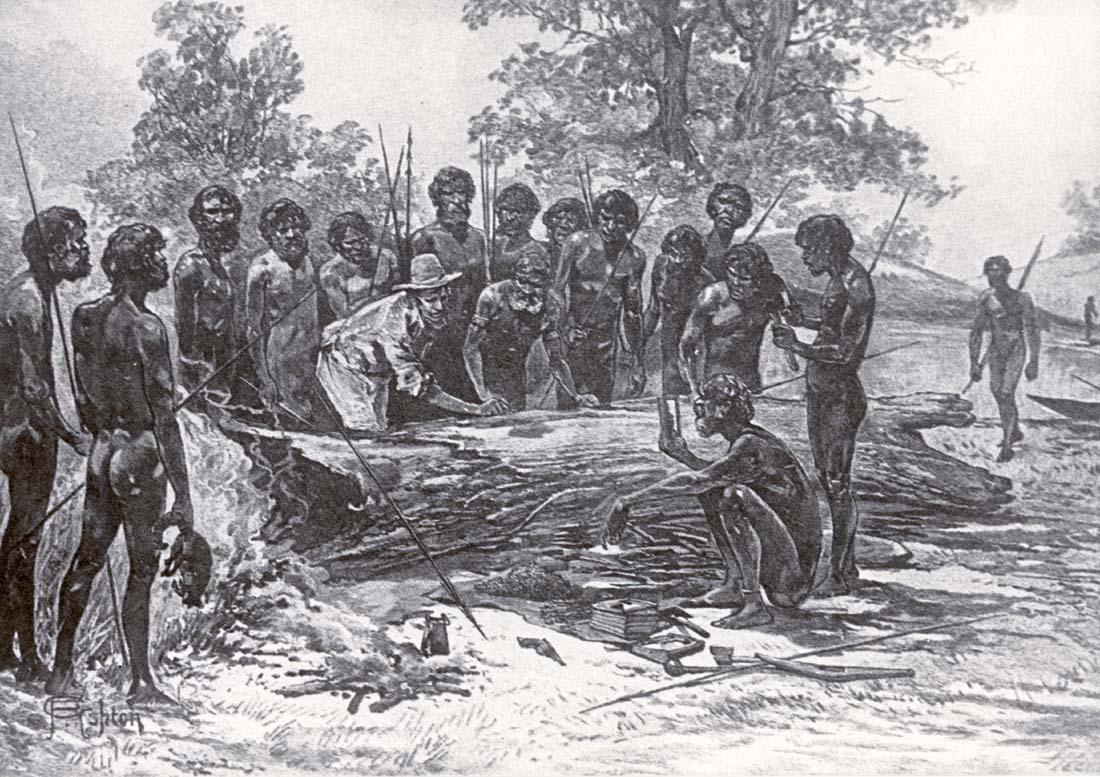
1880s Artist impression of Batman's Treaty being signed

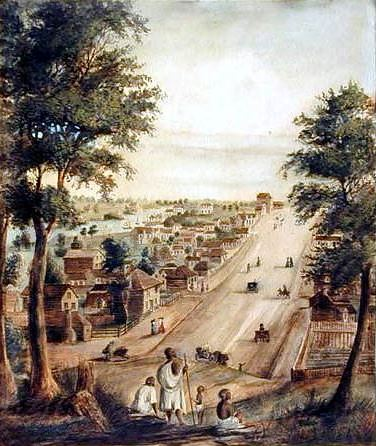
Collins Street, Melbourne, 1839. Watercolour by W. Knight

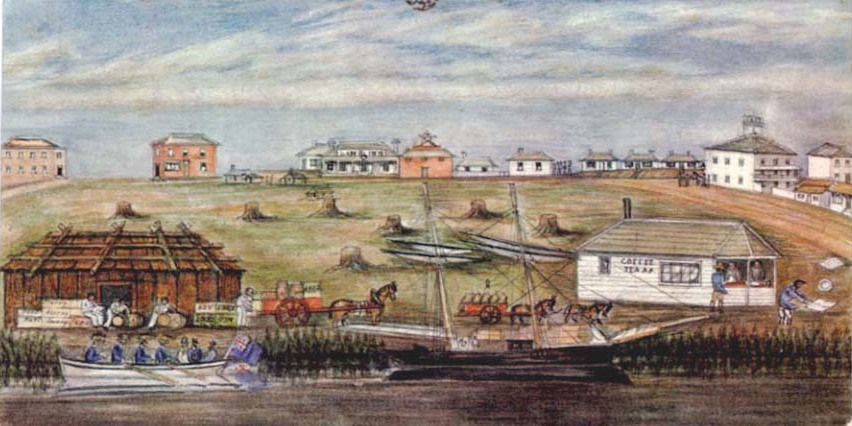
Melbourne Landing,1840; watercolor by W. Liardet (1840)

Lithograph of Melbourne from Princes Bridge in 1862.

On 6 June 1835, Batman, as part of a Tasmanian business syndicate known as the Port Phillip Association, signed a treaty with eight Wurundjeri elders in which he purported to buy 600,000 acres (2,400 km^{2}) of land around Melbourne and another 100,000 acres (400 km^{2}) around Geelong on Corio Bay to the south-west. On 8 June he wrote in his journal: "So the boat went up the large river... and... I am glad to state about six miles up found the River all good water and very deep. This will be the place for a village." The last sentence later became famous as the "founding charter" of Melbourne.

Batman returned to Launceston in Tasmania (then known as Van Diemen's Land) and began plans to mount a large expedition to establish a settlement on the Yarra. But John Fawkner, by now a businessman in Launceston, had the same idea. Fawkner bought a ship, the schooner Enterprize, which sailed on 4 August, with a party of intending settlers. When Batman's party reached the Yarra on 2 September, they were dismayed and angry to find Fawkner's people already in possession.

The two groups decided that there was plenty of land for everybody, and when Fawkner arrived on 16 October with another party of settlers, they agreed to parcel out land and not dispute who was there first. Both Batman and Fawkner settled in the new town.

Batman's Treaty with the Aborigines was annulled by the New South Wales government (which at the time governed all of eastern mainland Australia) on 26 August 1835 (and the annulment confirmed by the Colonial Office on 10 October 1835), but provided for compensation to the Association. Although this meant the settlers were now trespassing on Crown land, the government reluctantly accepted the settlers' fait accompli and allowed the town to remain.

In September 1836, Governor Richard Bourke established the Port Phillip District of New South Wales, though the borders had still not been determined, with the settlement as its administrative centre. (Bourke was authorised by London to establish a settlement in April 1836.) Bourke also appointed Captain William Lonsdale as police magistrate, chief agent of the government and commandant of the district. Captain William Hobson (later Governor of New Zealand) was instructed to accompany Lonsdale, his family and public officers to Port Phillip. The presence of a warship together with the Governor's agent indicated the Governor's intention to re-take control of the situation in Port Phillip. Lonsdale arrived at Port Phillip with his wife Martha, 7-month-old daughter Alice and his one assigned servant, on board HMS Rattlesnake, commanded by Hobson. They anchored at the south end of the Bay on 27 September 1836, where Hobson despatched a cutter for survey work, and by the 29th had proceeded north and anchored off Point Gellibrand, Hobsons Bay, near the mouth of the Yarra River. Lonsdale landed unofficially, distributing the official proclamation of the establishment of the new settlement, and did the same the next day. On 1 October 1836 Lonsdale was formally rowed up the Yarra River and was met by John Batman and Dr Thompson and other assembled settlers.

Bourke also commissioned Robert Hoddle to make the first plan for the town, completed on 25 March 1837, which came to be known as the Hoddle Grid. The surveys were intended to prepare for land sales by public auction. Bourke visited Port Phillip in March 1837, confirmed Lonsdale's choice of a site for the new town and named it Melbourne on 10 April 1837 after the then British prime minister William Lamb, 2nd Viscount Melbourne, who resided in the village of Melbourne in Derbyshire. The General Post Office opened under that name on 13 April 1837.^{[16]} Before being officially named, the town had several interim names – including Batmania, Bearbrass, Bareport, Bareheep, Barehurp and Bareberp. Public auctions for land began in June 1837. The compensation of the Port Phillip Association were only recognised to the extent of £7,000, allowed as a reduction on the purchase price of land bought by the association. Most of the members sold their entitlements to Charles Swanston.

George Gipps became Governor of New South Wales in 1838. In October 1839, he appointed Charles La Trobe as Superintendent of the district. He was a gifted man with artistic and scientific interests who did much to lay the foundations of Melbourne as a real city. La Trobe's most lasting contribution to the city was to reserve large areas as public parks: today these are the Treasury Gardens, the Carlton Gardens, the Flagstaff Gardens, Royal Park and the Royal Botanic Gardens.

A Separation Association had been formed in 1840 wanting Port Phillip District to become a separate colony, and the first petition for the separation was drafted by Henry Fyshe Gisborne and presented by him to Governor Gipps. The entire population of Port Philip in 1841 was 11,738.

On 12 August 1842, Melbourne was incorporated as a "town" by Act 6 Victoria No. 7 of the Governor and Legislative Council of New South Wales. On 25 June 1847, the City of Melbourne was declared by letters patent of Queen Victoria.

In December 1842 Charles Dowling arrived in Melbourne and would soon be a merchant concentrating on 'the settlers' trade', providing merchandise for the squatters and buying their produce which he would ship to England. Richard Goldsbrough, a woolstapler, came to Melbourne in 1847. He bought a weatherboard building on the corner of William Street and Flinders Lane, and set up a business as a classer and packer of wool for sale in England. In 1850 he set up the first regular wool auction in Bourke Street.

In 1843 there was a panic which was attributed to an influx of British capital being used for land speculations, with the money being deposited in banks at interest, lent to squatters, and its sudden withdrawal for the purpose of remitting to London in payment for immigration and other demands. The panic was also caused by low wool prices and the cessation of transportation.

== Early colonisation and displacement ==
Melbourne began as a collection of tents and huts on the banks of the Yarra River. The river was used for bathing and drinking water. The river had by the 1850s become quite polluted and was the cause of an epidemic of typhoid fever which hit the town resulting in many deaths. Though the Melbourne City Council opened the first Melbourne City Baths on 9 January 1860, people continued to swim and drink the river water.

Until the building boom which followed the gold rushes, most of Melbourne was built of timber, and almost nothing from this period survives. Two exceptions are St James Old Cathedral (1839) in Collins Street (now relocated to King Street opposite the Flagstaff Gardens), and St Francis Catholic Church (1841) in Elizabeth Street. Suburban development had already begun. The first sale of Crown lands in St Kilda took place on 7 December 1842, and the wealthy began building houses by the seashore, and a port developed at Williamstown. In 1844, a bridge was built to span the Yarra River at Swanston Street. The bridge replaced the privately operated punts. The bridge was a privately built wooden trestle toll bridge. In 1850, a government-built sandstone free bridge replaced the wooden bridge.

In 1848, Charles Perry became the first Anglican bishop for Melbourne, and James Alipius Goold became the Catholic Bishop of Melbourne.

With the arrival of Europeans in the area, the local indigenous people were hard hit by introduced diseases, and their decline was hastened by mistreatment, alcohol and venereal disease. There were also frontier conflicts such as the Battle of Yering in 1840, and the subsequent enforced removal of Aboriginal people from the Melbourne township during the Lettsom raid. Simon Wonga made moves to reclaim land for Kulin people to settle on in 1859, but they were not successful until 1863 when the surviving members of the Wurundjeri and other Woiwurrung speakers were given 'permissive occupancy' of Coranderrk Station, near Healesville and forcibly resettled.

In July 1851 the successful agitation of the Port Phillip settlers led to the establishment of Victoria as a separate colony, and La Trobe became its first Lieutenant-Governor. In 1851 the white population of the whole Port Phillip District was still only 77,000, and only 23,000 people lived in Melbourne. Melbourne had already become a centre of Australia's wool export trade.

A few months after separation, gold was discovered at several locations around the colony, most notably at Ballarat and Bendigo. The ensuing gold rush radically transformed Victoria, and particularly Melbourne. During land speculation of the 1850s many stone and brick public and financial buildings were built.

== 1850s gold rush ==
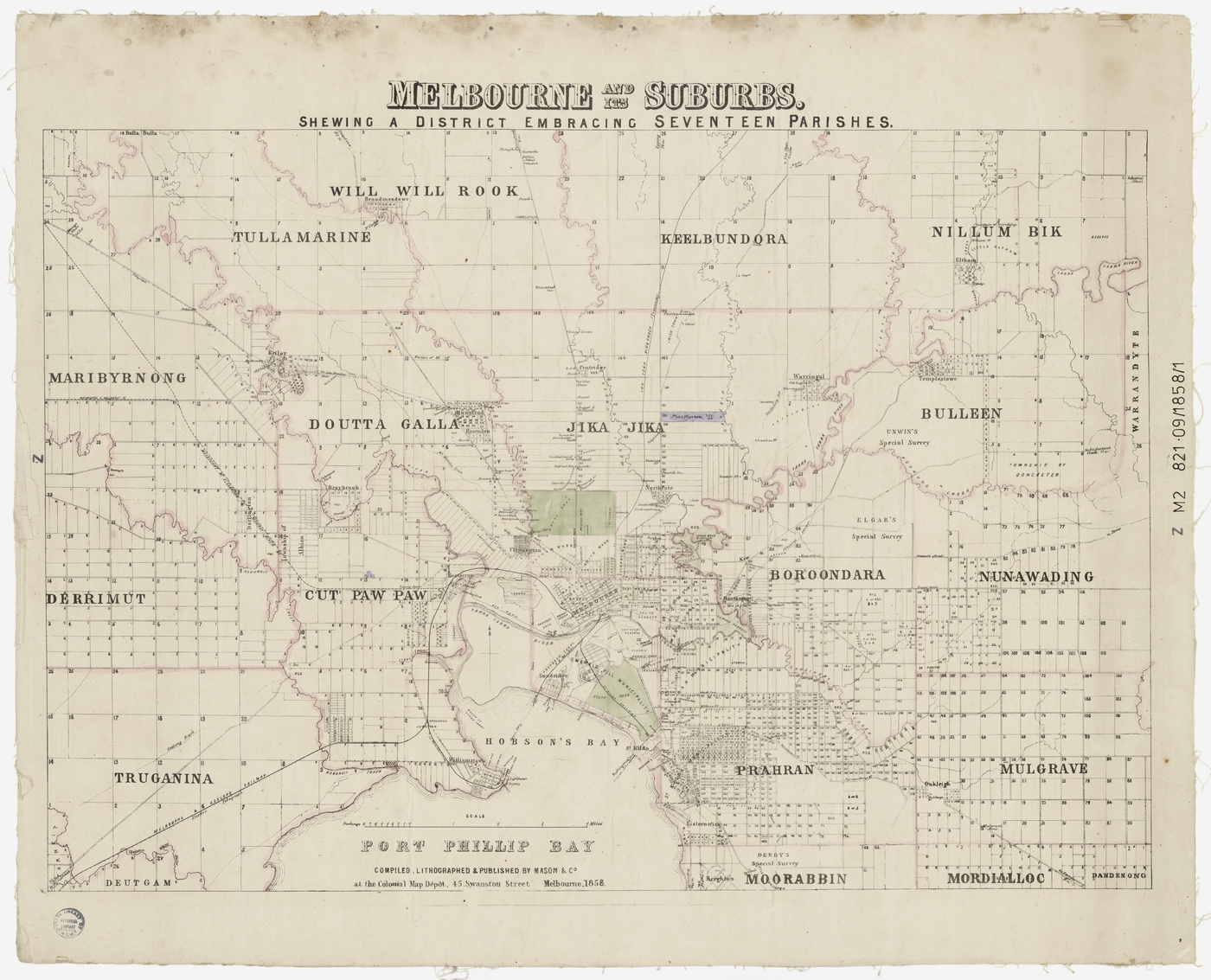
Cadastral map of Melbourne, 1858

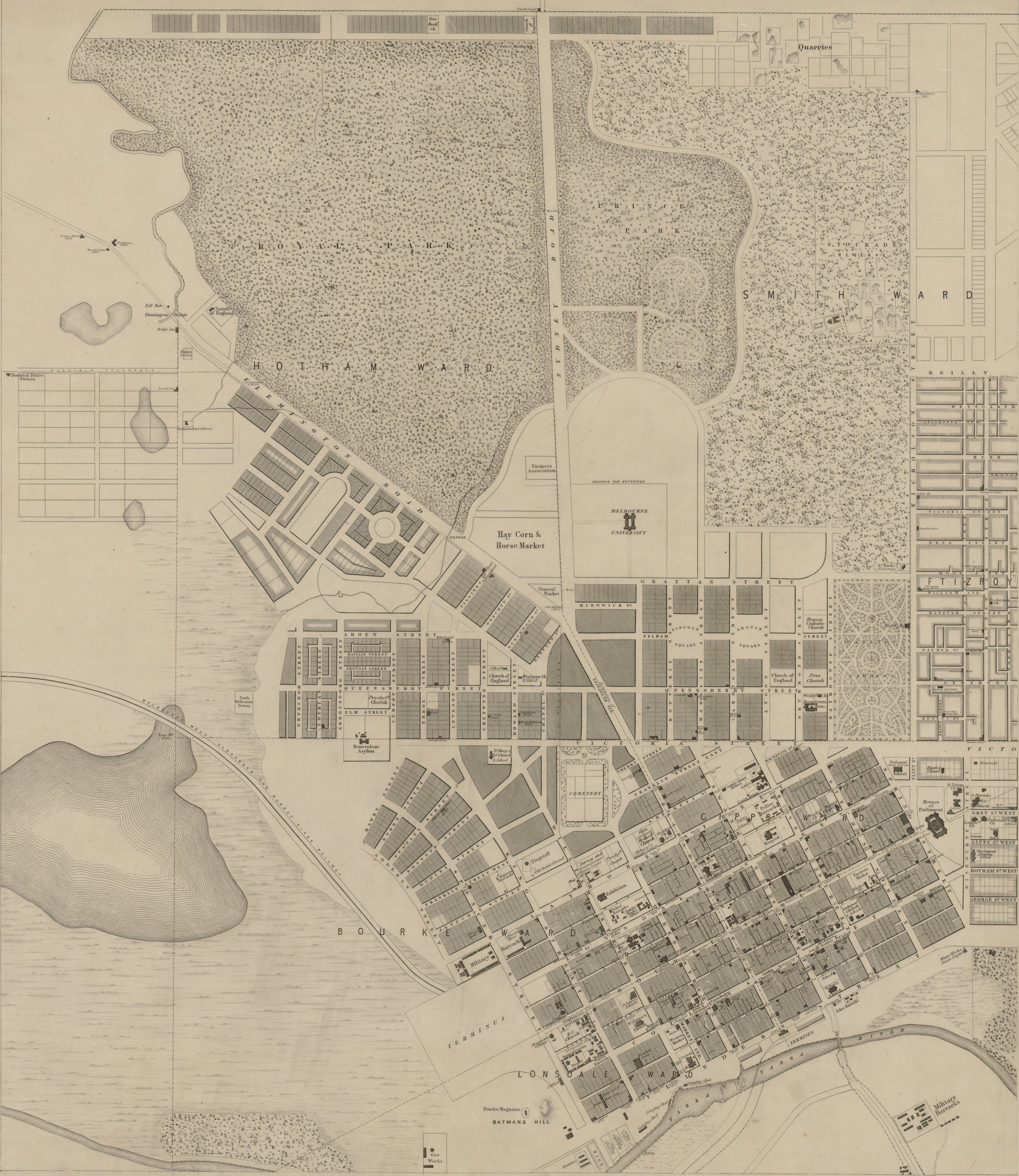
Map of Melbourne in 1855

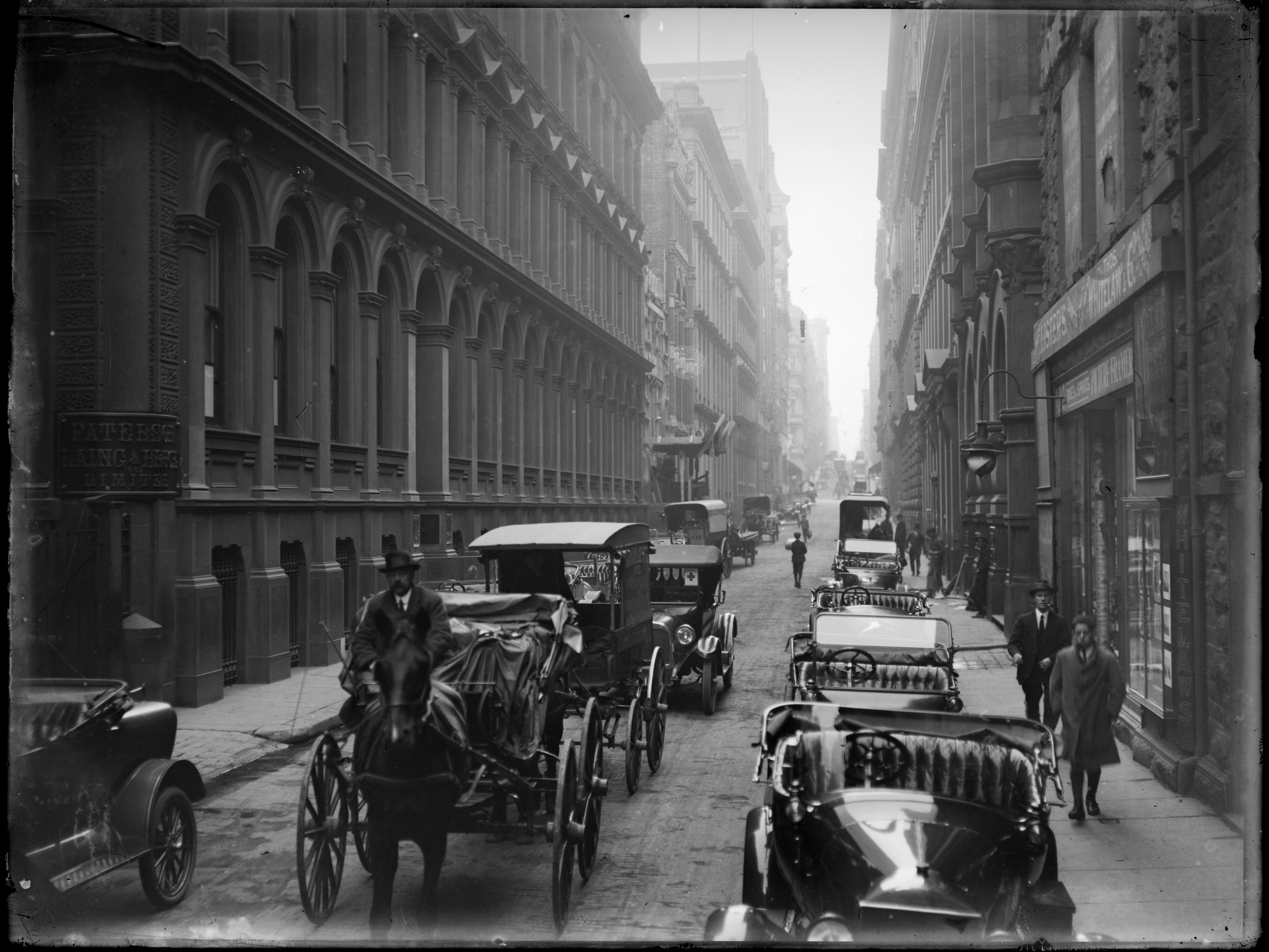
Looking down Flinders Lane, ca. 1891 – ca. 1914

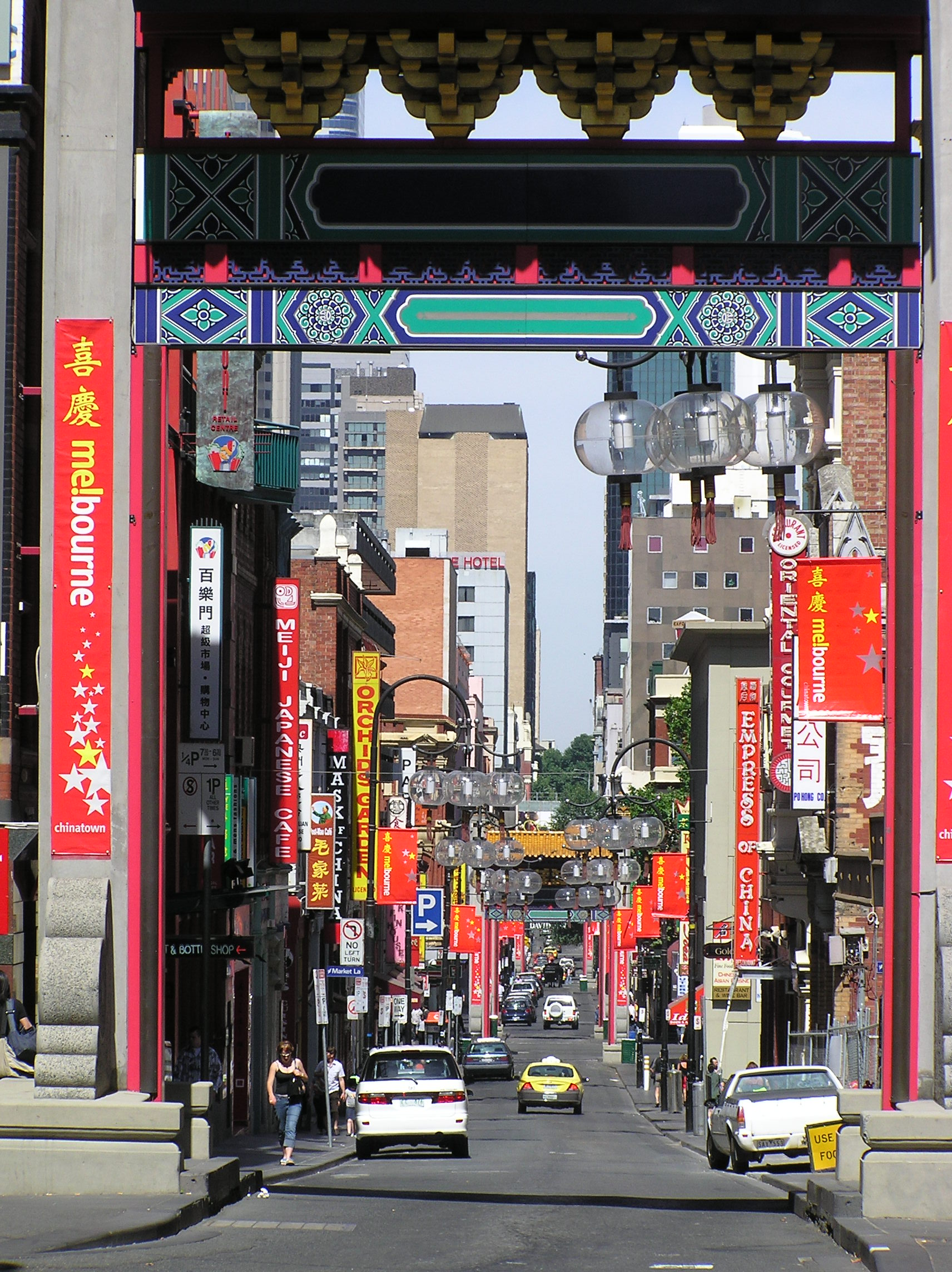
Chinatown, Melbourne was founded by Chinese immigrants during the Victorian gold rush

The discovery of gold led to a huge influx of people to Victoria, most of them arriving by sea at Melbourne. The town's population doubled within a year. In 1852, 75,000 people arrived in the colony and this, combined with a very high birthrate, led to rapid population growth. The concurrent dispossession of the Aboriginal populations in those areas of inland Victoria which had not already been cleared for sheep runs was equally rapid.

In 1853 work began on the Yan Yean Reservoir to provide water for Melbourne. Piped water started to flow in 1857. Victoria's population reached 400,000 in 1857 and 500,000 in 1860. As the easy gold ran out many of these people flooded into Melbourne or became a pool of unemployed in cities around Ballarat and Bendigo. There arose a huge wave of social unrest urging the opening of the lands in rural Victoria for small yeoman farming. In 1857 a Land Convention was held in Melbourne. Later a provisional government was formed by land hungry miners demanding land reform.

The accelerated population growth and the enormous wealth of the goldfields fuelled a boom which lasted for forty years, and ushered in the era known as "marvellous Melbourne." The city spread eastwards and northwards over the surrounding flat grasslands, and southwards down the eastern shore of Port Phillip. Wealthy new suburbs like South Yarra, Toorak, Kew and Malvern grew up, while the working classes settled in Richmond, Collingwood and Fitzroy.

The influx of educated gold seekers from England led to rapid growth of schools, churches, learned societies, libraries and art galleries. Australia's first telegraph line was erected between Melbourne and Williamstown in 1853. The first railway in Australia was built in Melbourne in 1854 between the city and Port Melbourne, then known as Sandridge. Also in 1854, the government offered four religious groups land on which to build schools. These included the Wesleyan Methodist Church, and the Anglican Church. These resulted in Wesley College and Melbourne Grammar School being built on St Kilda Road a few years later. The University of Melbourne was founded in 1855 and the State Library of Victoria in 1856. The foundation stone of St Patrick's Catholic Cathedral was laid in 1858 and that of St Paul's Anglican Cathedral in 1880. The Philosophical Institute of Victoria received a Royal Charter in 1859 and became the Royal Society of Victoria. In 1860 this Society assembled Victoria's only organised attempt at inland exploration, the Burke and Wills expedition, with other exploration being more ad hoc.

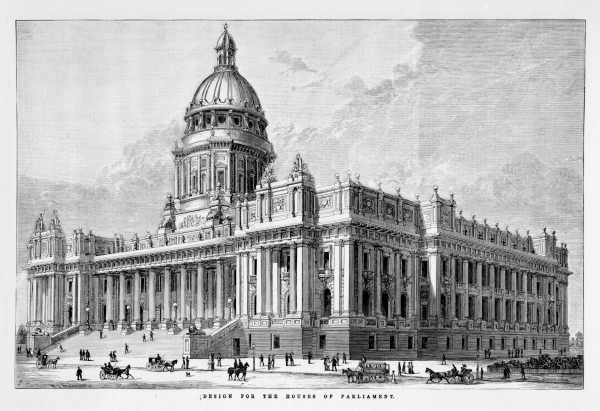
Lithograph of the original plans for Parliament House, Melbourne showing a grand dome which was not built.

A Melbourne Town Council had been created in 1847, and one by one other suburbs also gained town status, complete with town councils and mayors. In 1851 a party-elected Legislative Council, dominated by squatter interests, opposed the notion of universal suffrage and the role of the Legislative Assembly. In December 1854 discontent with the licensing system on the goldfields led to the rising at the Eureka Stockade, one of only two armed rebellions in Australian history (the other being the Castle Hill convict rebellion of 1804).

In November 1856, Victoria was given a constitution and in the following year full responsible government with a bicameral Parliament. For Melbourne, the major consequence was the magnificent edifice of Parliament House, Melbourne, which was started in December 1855 and extended to the present state between 1856 and 1929; it was not completed to the original design.

The boom fuelled by gold and wool lasted through the 1860s and '70s. Victoria suffered from an acute labour shortage despite its steady influx of migrants, and this pushed up wages until they were the highest in the world. Victoria was known as "the working man's paradise" in these years. The Stonemasons Union won the eight-hour day in 1856 and celebrated by building the enormous Melbourne Trades Hall in Carlton.

== 1880s and 1890s expansion ==
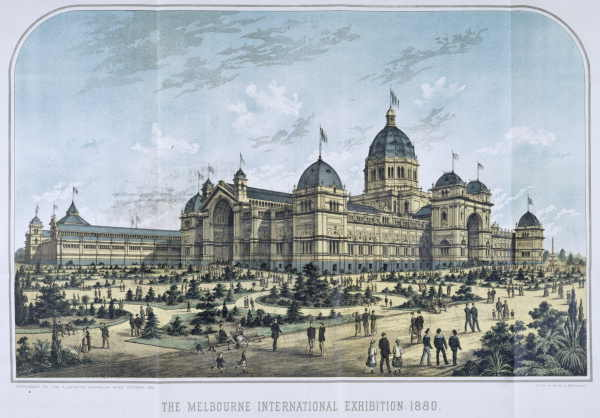
Lithograph of the building hosting the World's Fair of 1880 showing the rear wings which no longer exist.

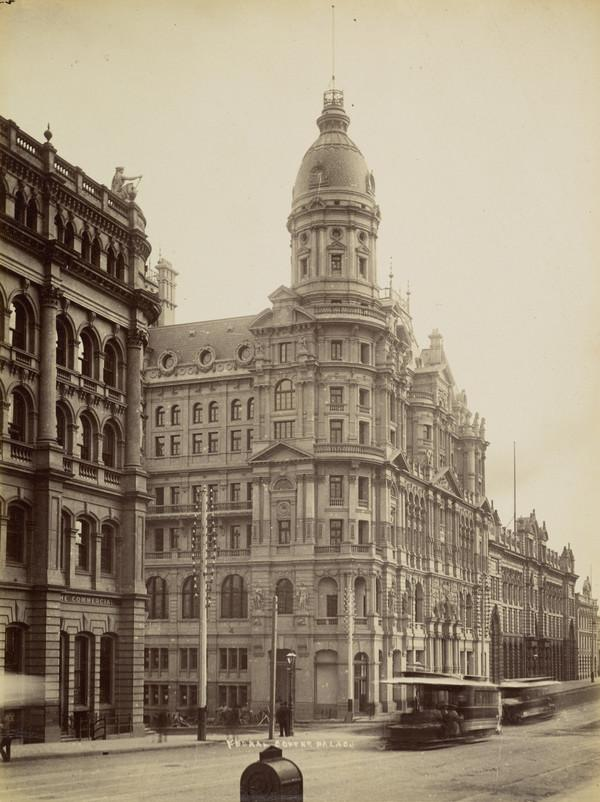
The Federal Coffee Palace on Collins Street, a temperance hotel built in 1888.

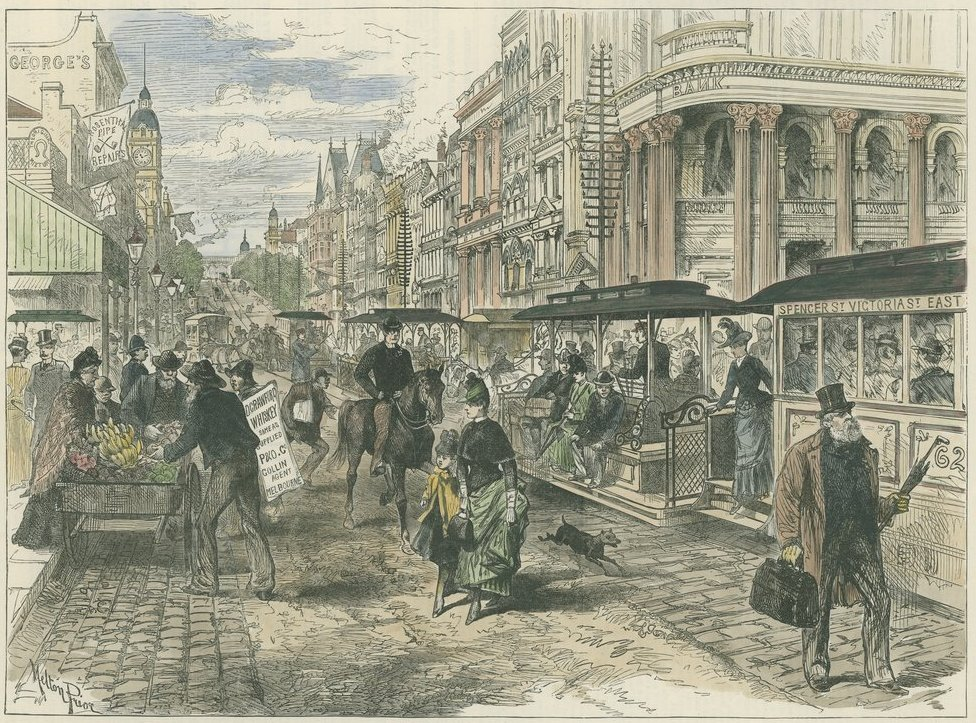
Spencer Street, 1889

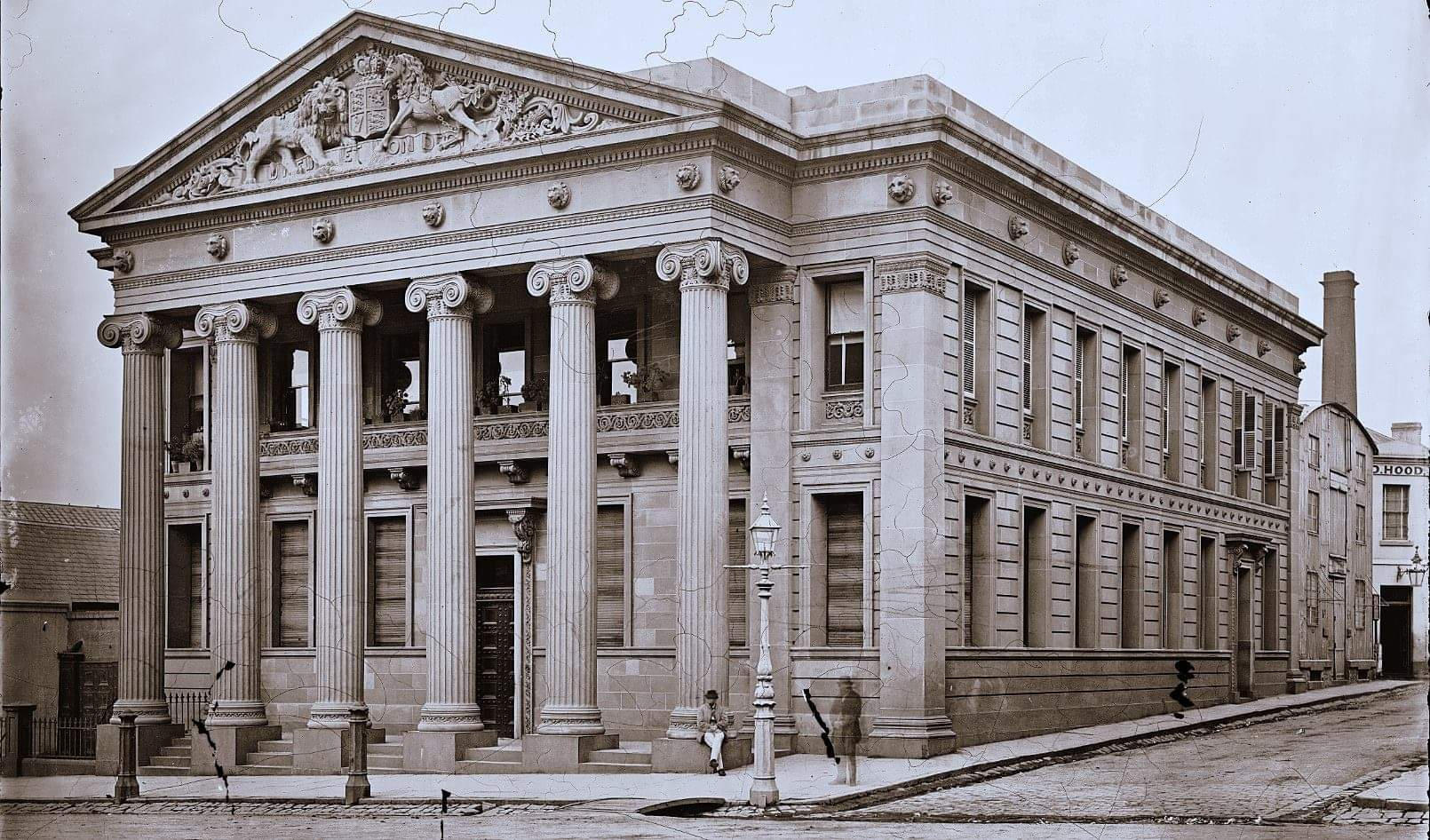
The Oriental Bank, pictured here in the 1870s, was demolished after it went broke in 1884.

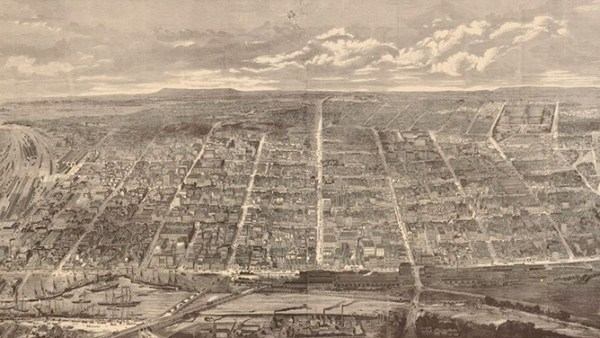
Melbourne 1880, Samuel Calvert, showing an organised grid layout of the city streets, 1880.

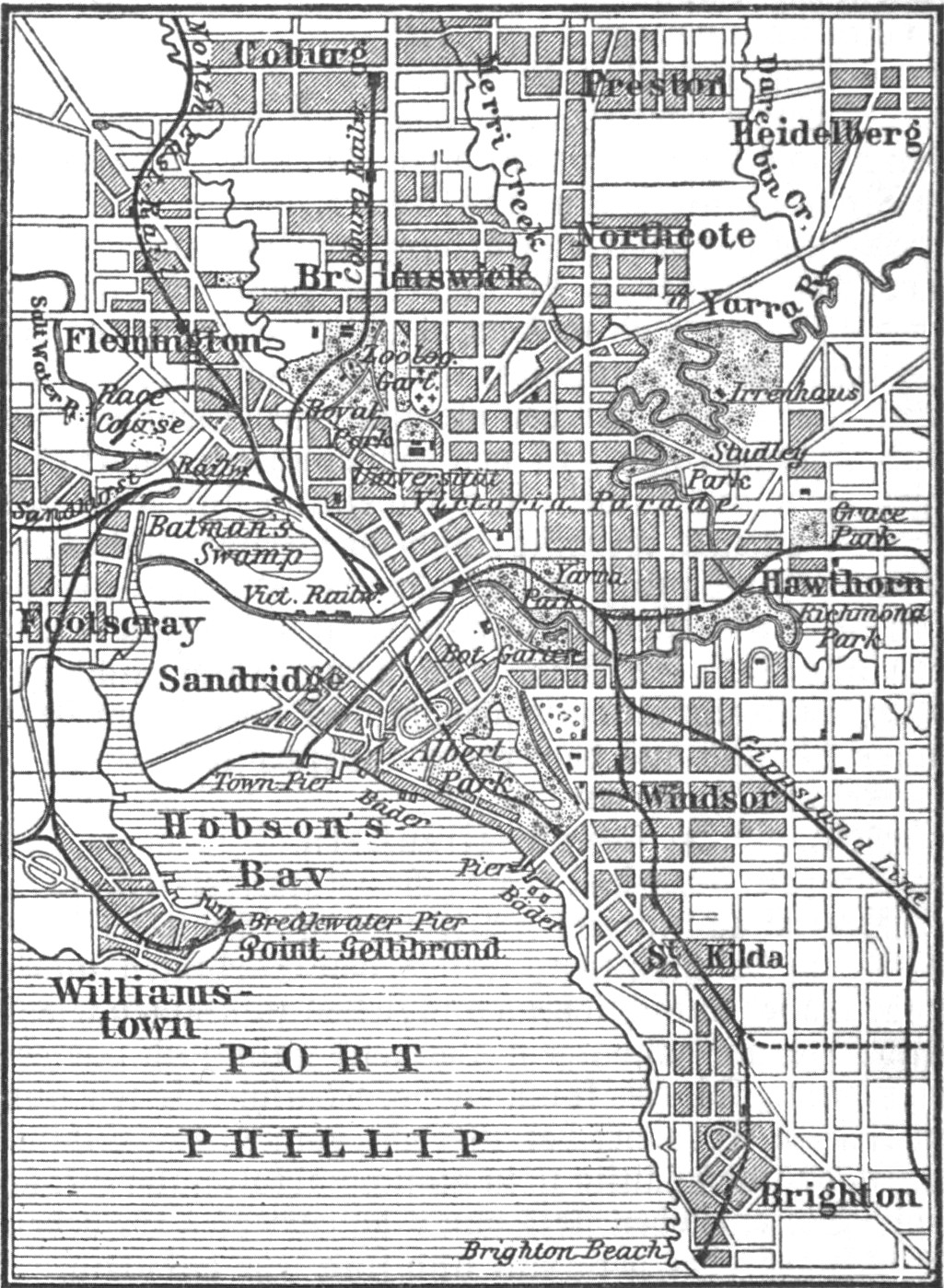
A map dating from the 1880s showing the well-established suburbs of Melbourne.

Melbourne's population reached 280,000 in 1880 and 445,000 in 1889. For a time it was the second-largest city in the British Empire, after London. During the boom, Melbourne had reputedly become the richest city in the world. In terms of area, Melbourne was already one of the largest cities in the world. Rather than building high-density apartment blocks like European cities, Melbourne expanded in all directions in the characteristic Australian suburban sprawl so Australians were afforded their Australian Dream of a "quarter acre block" in the suburbs, much like the American model.

The middle classes lived in detached villas on large blocks of land, while the working class lived in reasonably comfortable cottages in the northern and western suburbs, and older areas like Fitzroy and Collingwood became slums. Most of the new heavy industry was concentrated in the western suburbs. The wealthy built huge mansions beside the sea or in the picturesque Yarra Valley.

The new suburbs were serviced by networks of trains and trams which were among the largest and most modern in the world. Melbourne's civic pride was demonstrated by the huge edifice of the Royal Exhibition Building, built in 1880 to house the Melbourne International Exhibition.

In the 1880s the long boom culminated in a frenzy of speculation and rapid inflation of land prices known as the Land Boom. Governments shared in the wealth and ploughed money into urban infrastructure, particularly railways. Huge fortunes were built on speculation, and Victorian business and politics became notorious for corruption. English banks lent freely to colonial speculators, adding to the mountain of debt on which the boom was built.

== 1891 economic bust ==
In 1891 the inevitable happened: a spectacular crash brought the boom to an abrupt end. Banks and other businesses failed in large numbers, thousands of shareholders lost their money, tens of thousands of workers were put out of work. Although there are no reliable statistics, there was probably 20 percent unemployment in Melbourne throughout the 1890s.

Melbourne had 490,000 people in 1890, and this figure scarcely changed for the next 15 years as a result of the crash and subsequent long slump. Immigration dried up, emigration to the goldfields of Western Australia and South Africa increased, and the high birthrate of the mid 19th century fell sharply and the city's growth continued, but very slowly.

== "Australia's capital": 1901–1927 ==
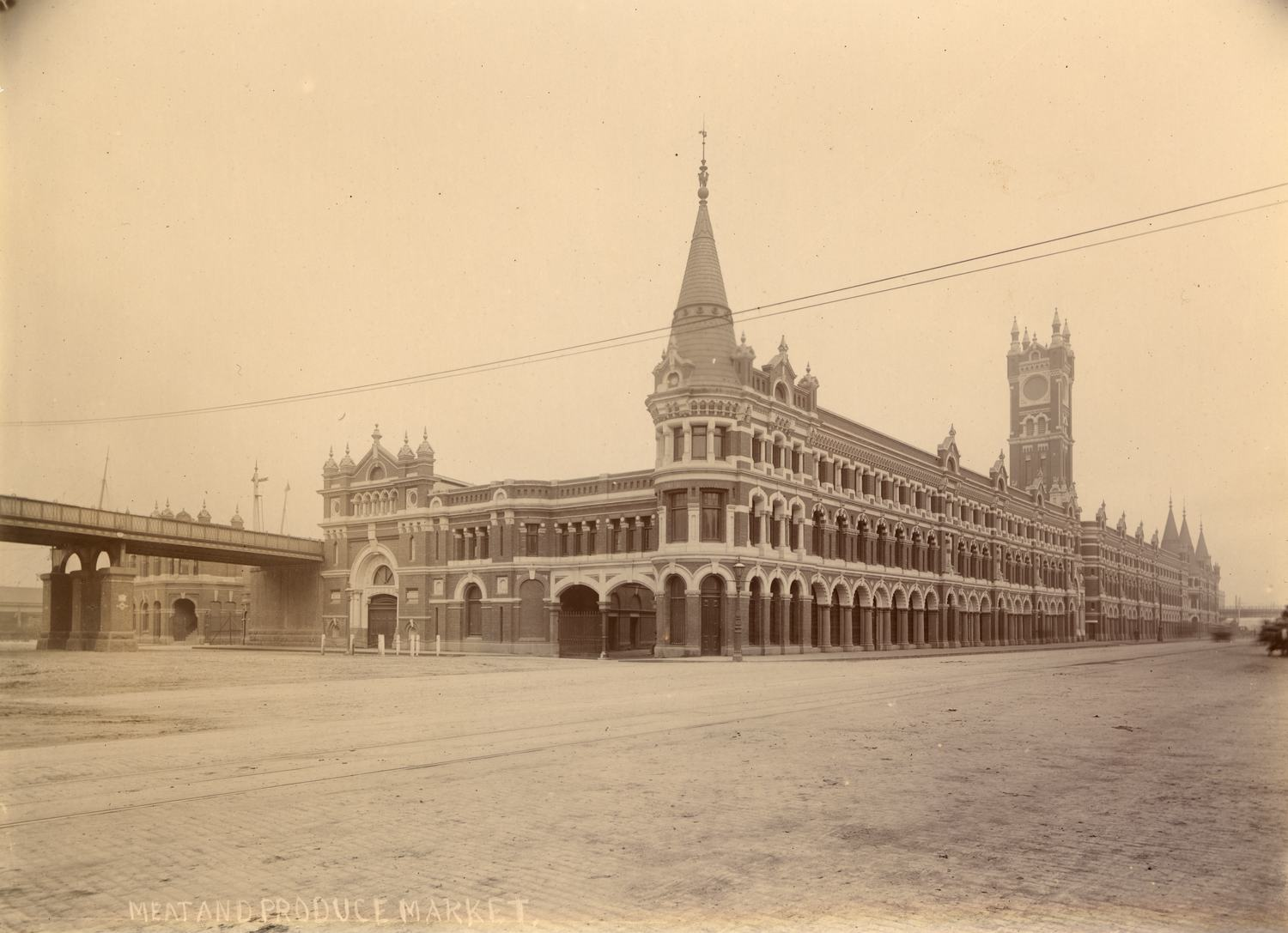
Fish Markets, Flinders Street, circa 1890

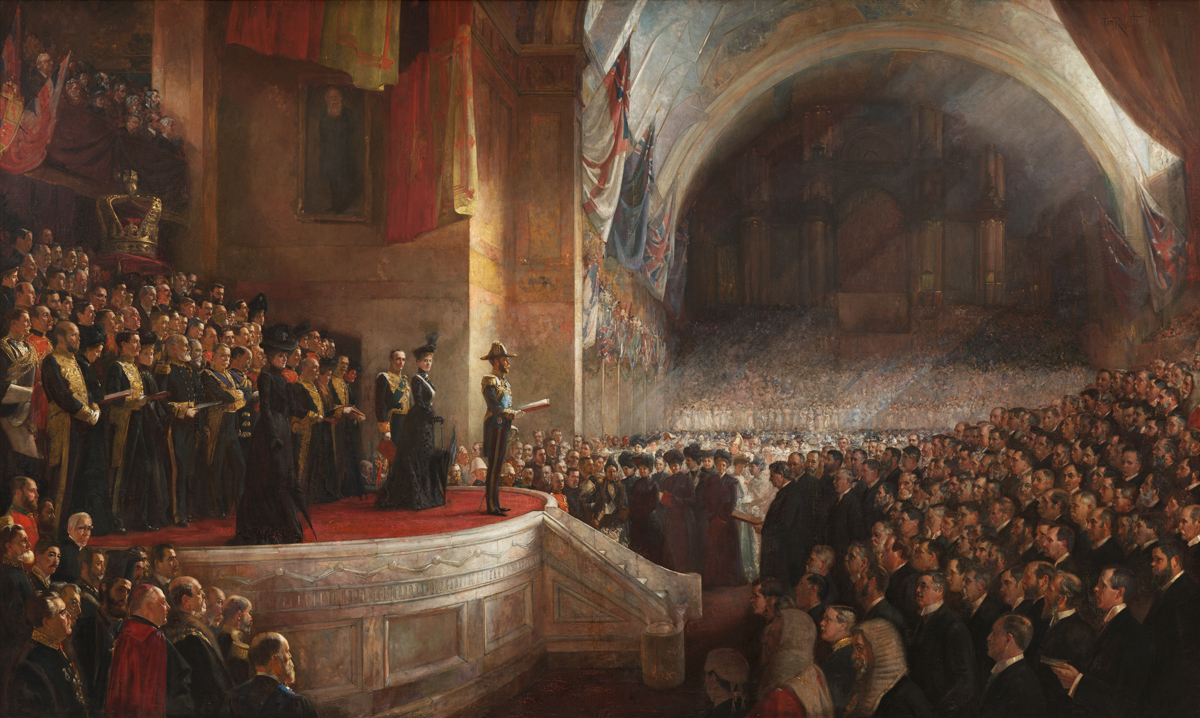
The opening of the first Parliament of Australia on 9 May 1901, painted by Tom Roberts

Melbourne's status as Australia's largest city lasted long enough, however, for it to become the seat of government of the new Commonwealth of Australia when the six colonies federated in 1901. Parliament House in Spring St was lent to the Parliament of Australia, while Victoria's Parliament found temporary accommodation in the Royal Exhibition Building.

The city's growth stalled, and by 1905 Sydney had resumed its place as Australia's largest city.

Economic growth slowly resumed from 1900, and Melbourne's population reached 670,000 by 1914. But the boom years did not return, and the level of wages remained far lower than it had been in the 1880s. As a result, urban poverty became a feature of city life, and the slum areas of the inner suburbs spread.

Due to long delays in establishing a permanent capital at Canberra, Melbourne remained Australia's capital until 1927, when the parliament finally moved to the 'country capital'. Melbourne nevertheless remained the centre of the Commonwealth Public Service, the Australian Defence Forces, and as the location of the High Court of Australia for some time afterwards.

== Interwar period ==
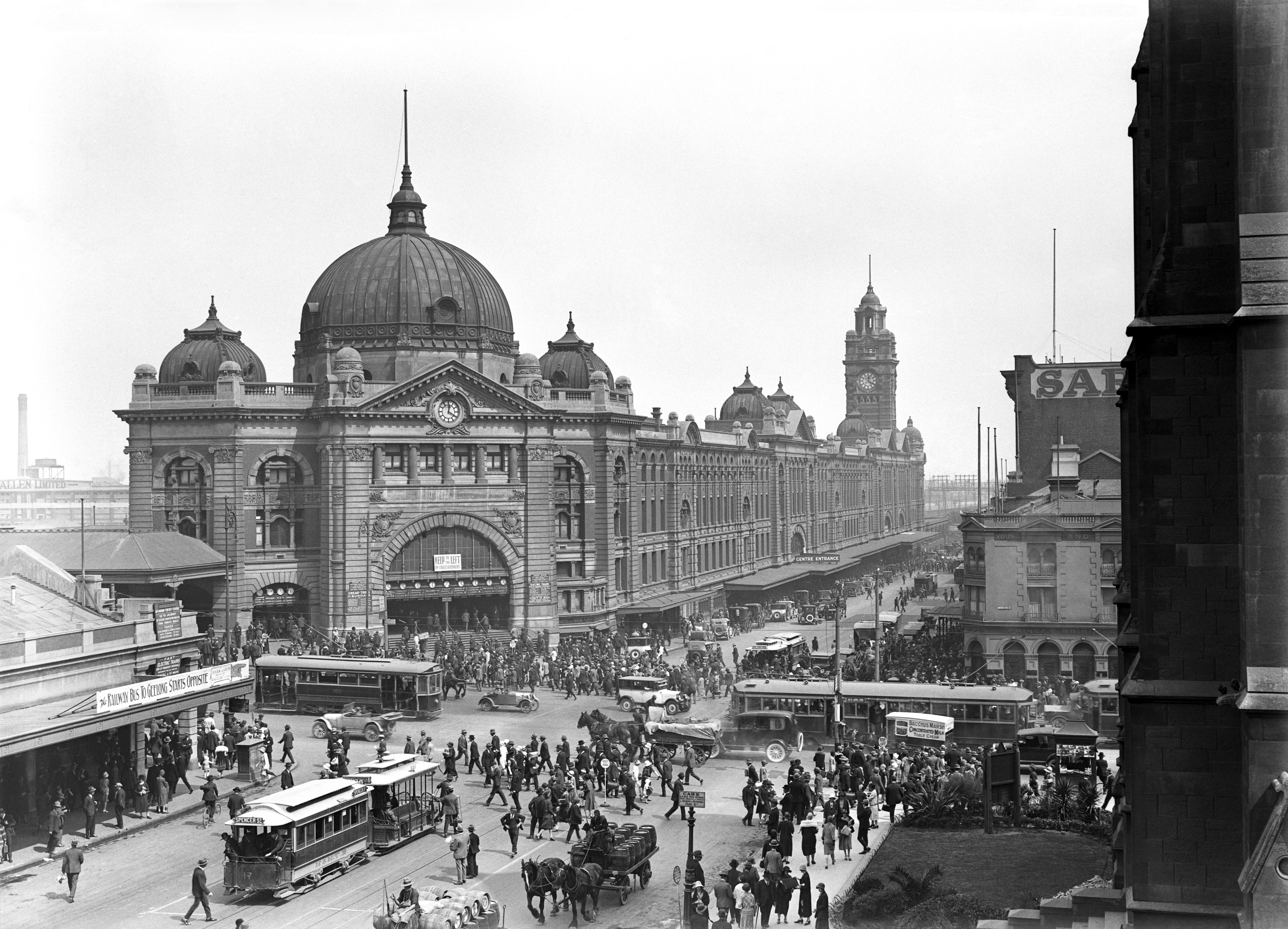
Flinders Street station, intersection of Swanston and Flinders Streets in 1927 when it was the world's busiest passenger station.

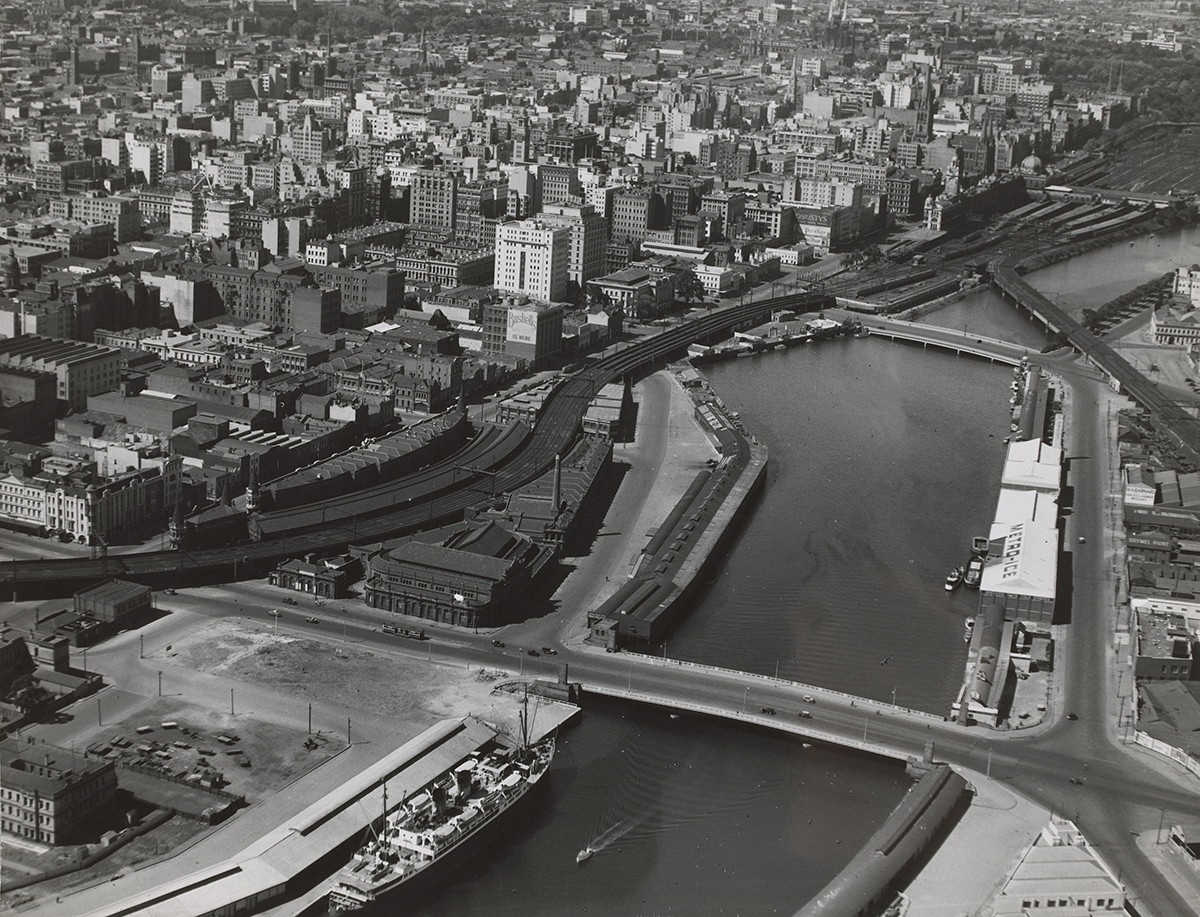
ca. 1936-39: A view of Melbourne's city centre along the Yarra from above Spencer Street bridge towards the Queen Street bridge.

Melbourne's mood was also darkened by the terrible sacrifices of World War I, in which 112,000 Victorians enlisted and 16,000 were killed. There were bitter political divisions during the war, with Melbourne's Irish-born Catholic Archbishop Daniel Mannix leading opposition to conscription for the war and the Labor Party suffering a traumatic split. Another 4,000 Victorians died in the Spanish flu epidemic which followed the war. There was a modest revival of prosperity in the 1920s, and the population reached 1 million in 1930, but in 1929 the Wall Street crash ushered in the Great Depression, which lasted until a brief return to prosperity in the late 1930s, cut short by the outbreak of World War II.

In 1934 Melbourne celebrated its centenary and acquired another great landmark, the Shrine of Remembrance on St Kilda Road. The population stagnated again, and was still only 1.1 million in 1940.

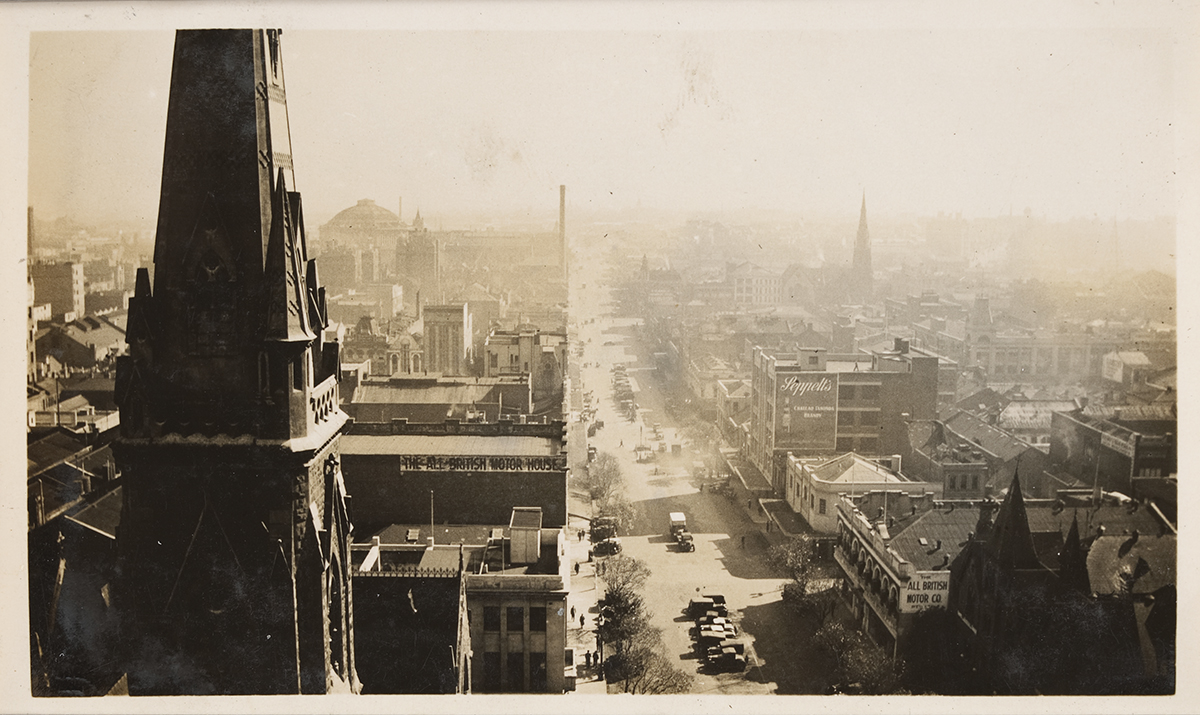
Elevated view of Russell Street, with the spire of Scots' Church to the left, taken from the T & G Building circa April 1932.

== World War II ==
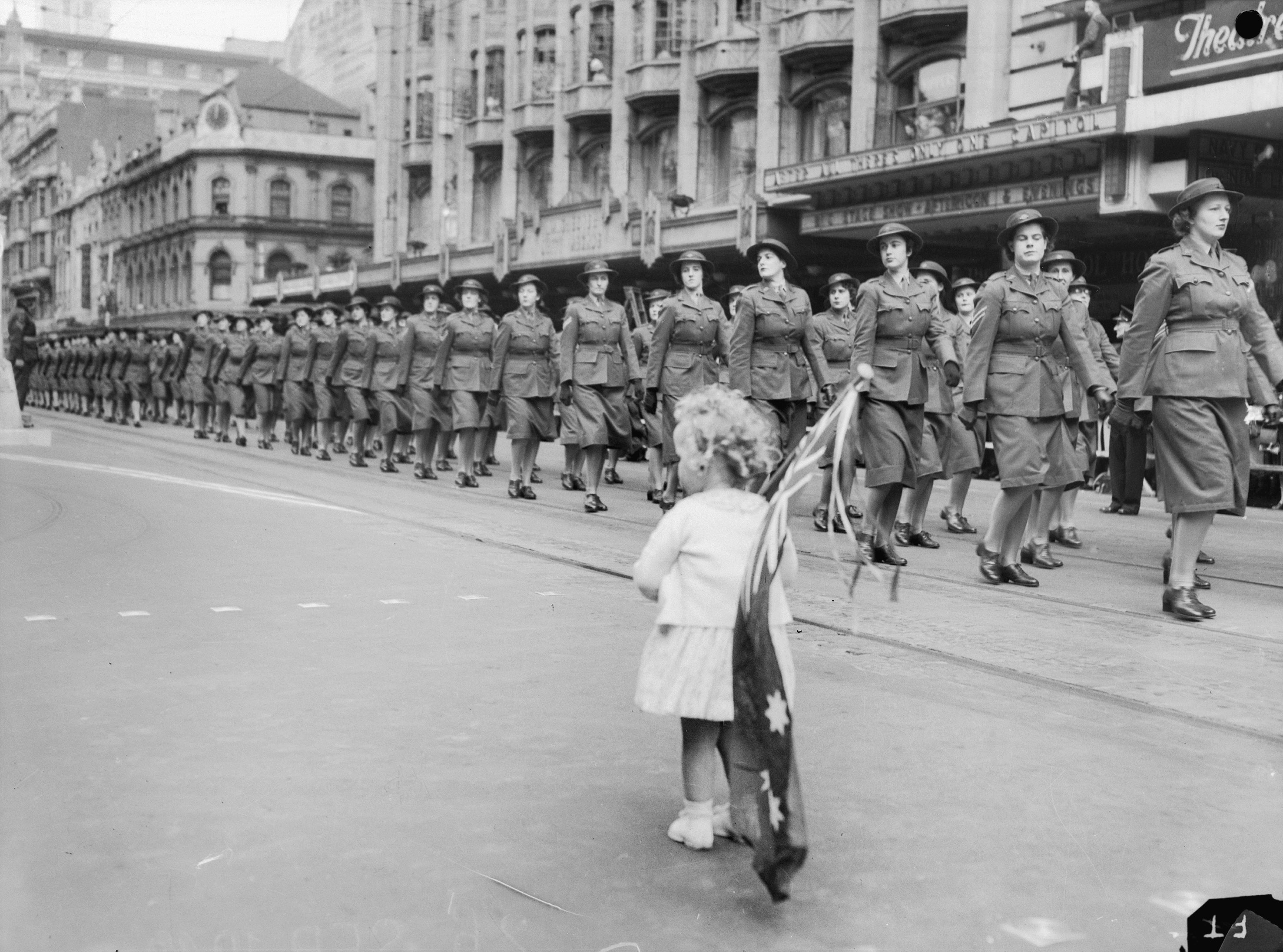
Members of the Australian Women's Army Service in Melbourne, 1942

During World War II, although Canberra was officially the capital, most of the military and civilian administration was centred in Melbourne, and the city's economy benefited from wartime full employment and the influx of American service personnel (including General Douglas MacArthur, who briefly made his headquarters in Collins St before relocating to Brisbane).

== Post World War II ==
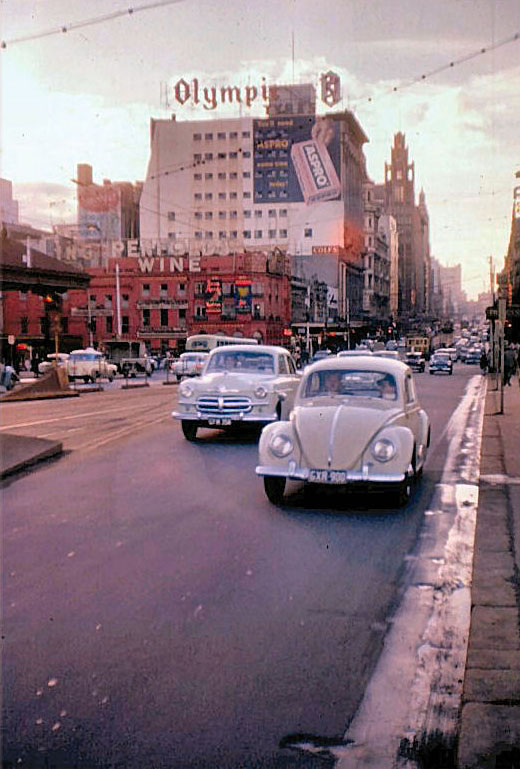
Swanston Street from Princes Bridge in 1959

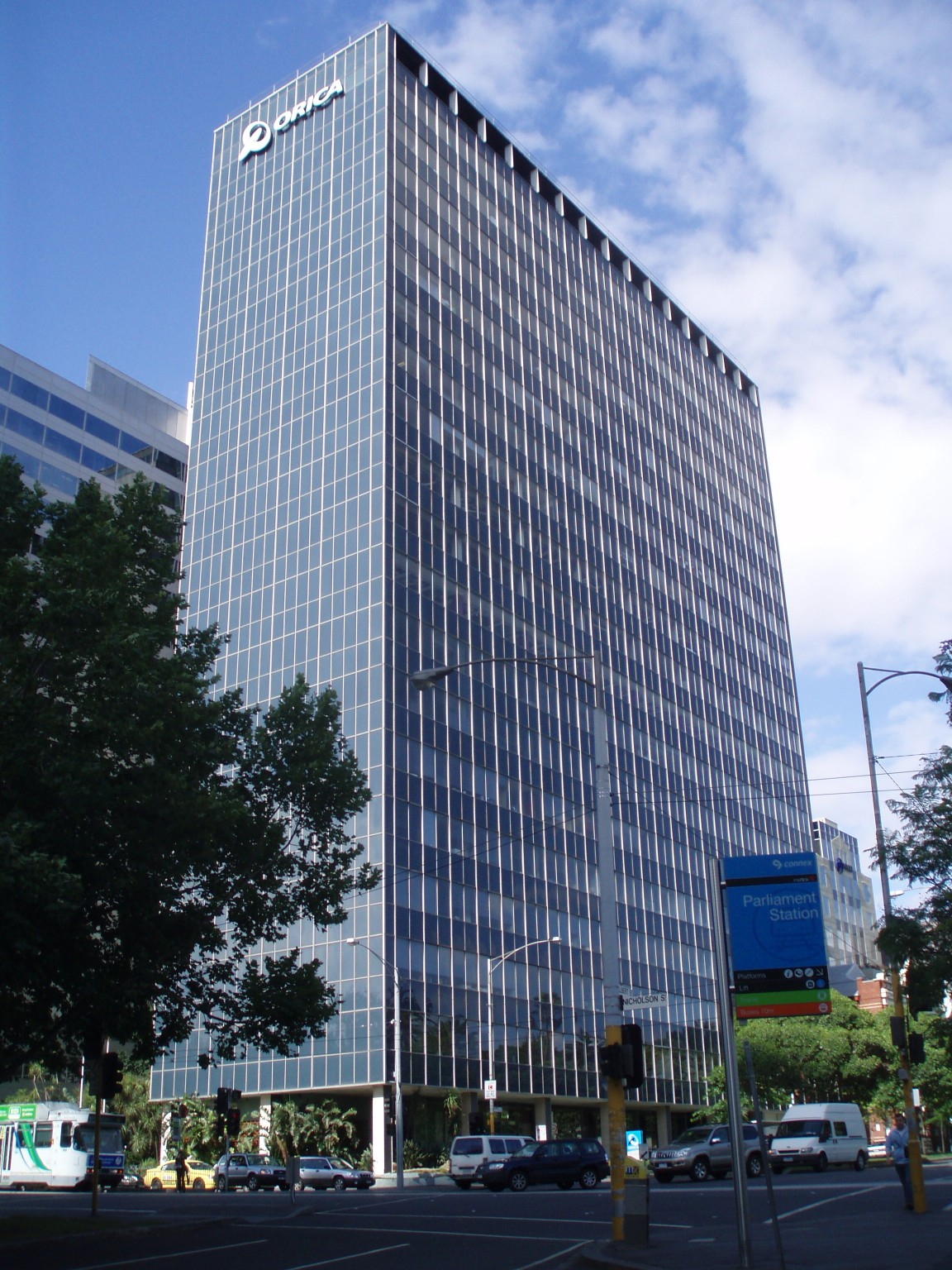
ICI House, built in 1955, was a powerful symbol of the Olympic city's modern aspirations.

After World War II, a new era of increasing prosperity arrived, fuelled by high prices for Victoria's wool, increased government spending on transport and education, and the stimulus of renewed high immigration. Unlike prewar immigration, which had been mostly from the British Isles, the postwar program brought an influx of Europeans, at first mostly refugees from eastern and central Europe. A large proportion of these immigrants were Jews, and the Jewish population of Melbourne became the largest population proportionally of any Australian city, at about 1.4% in 1970. They were followed by migrants from Italy, Greece and the Netherlands.

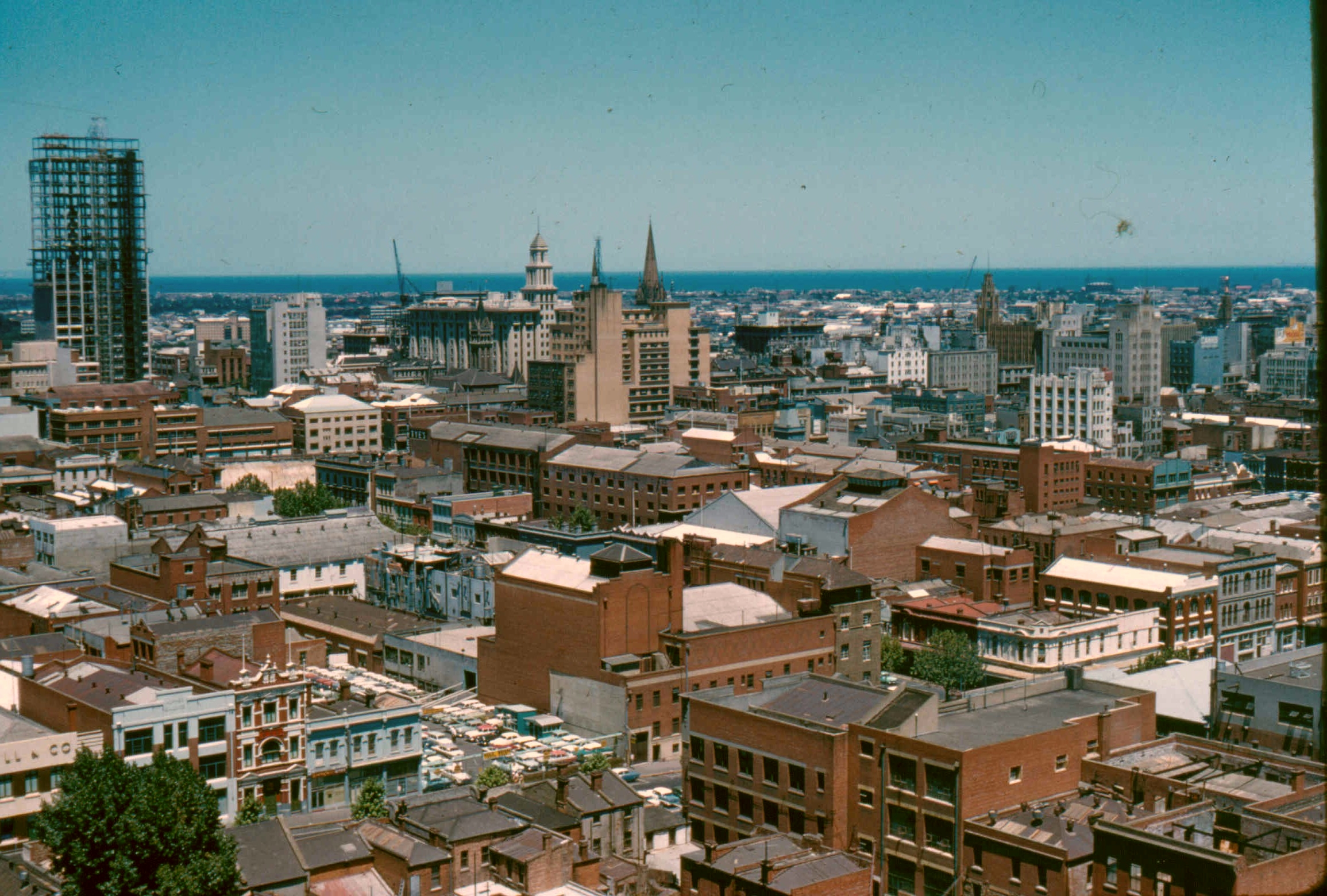
View of Melbourne's City Centre before the height boom, 1960.

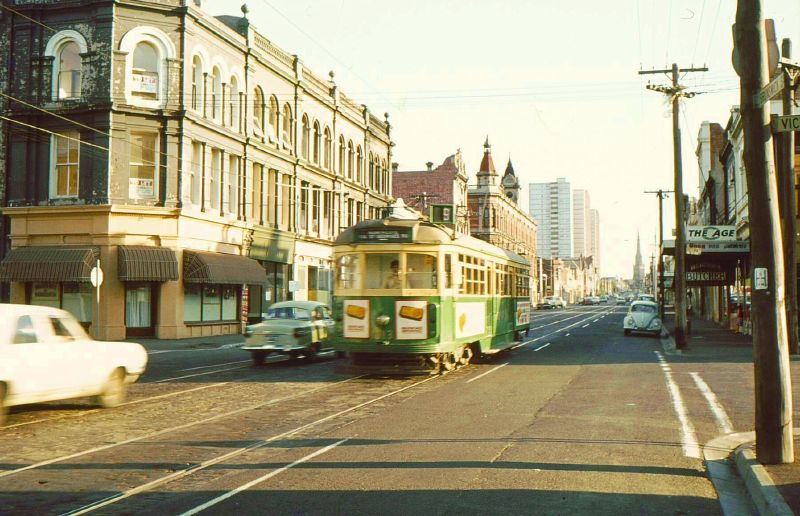
A tram travels down Brunswick Street, 1979.

Later, in the 1960s, migrants came from Yugoslavia, Turkey, Hungary and Lebanon. These inflows rapidly transformed the city's demographic profile and many aspects of its life. This new growth required new spending on infrastructure such as roads, schools and hospitals, which had been neglected during the long decades of recession and low growth between 1890 and 1940. Henry Bolte, Premier from 1955 to 1972, was responsible for much of this rapid development of infrastructure. Under Bolte, some of the old inner-city slums were bulldozed and the dislocated tenants were housed in high-rise blocks of state-owned apartments.

Since the 1970s, the pace of change in Melbourne has been increasingly rapid. The end of the White Australia Policy brought the first significant Asian migration to Melbourne since the gold rushes, with large numbers of people from Vietnam, Cambodia and China arriving. For the first time, Melbourne acquired a large Muslim population, and the official policy of multiculturalism encouraged Melbourne's various ethnic and religious minorities to maintain and celebrate their identities. At the same time, the practice of mainstream Christianity largely declined, leading to a secularisation of public life.

State patronage of the arts led to a boom in festivals, theatre, music and the visual arts. Tourism became a major industry, bringing still more foreign faces to Melbourne's streets. In 1956, the city became the first in the Southern Hemisphere to host the Olympic Games. Two new universities opened, Monash University in 1961 and La Trobe University in 1967, followed by others in the 1980s, maintaining Melbourne's place as a leader in tertiary education.

=== 1980s–1990s ===
Increasing urban sprawl spread from Werribee in the south-west to Healesville in the north-east and encompassing much of the Mornington Peninsula and Dandenong Ranges to the south and east. A program of freeway construction was fast tracked in the 1970s and 1980s, while the expansion of rail and tram networks were neglected, aside from the opening of the City Loop in 1981. These factors led to the rapid growth of the number and use of private cars.

=== 1989 financial crash ===
High interest rates and poor governance contributed to a financial crash in 1989. The collapse of merchant bank Tricontinental, Pyramid Building Society, businesses, property values and the forced sale of State Bank of Victoria led to a deep recession. Melbourne's population growth slowed during the early 1990s as employment contracted, with a rise in migration to other states such as Queensland.

In turn this recession contributed to the fall of Joan Kirner's Labor government and the election in 1992 of a radical free-market Liberal government under Jeff Kennett. Kennett's team restored Victoria's finances by making sweeping cuts to public expenditure, closing many schools, privatising the tramways and electricity infrastructure, reducing the size of the public service, and local government restructuring. These reforms came at a high social cost, but ultimately restored confidence in Melbourne's economy and led to a resumption of growth. In 1999 Kennett was voted out of office, but key landmarks that his government commissioned, such as the Melbourne Convention & Exhibition Centre and the new Melbourne Museum, remain, and many of his reforms have been maintained.

Partly as a result of the increasing difficulty of travelling across the city, the central business centre declined, and satellite suburbs such as Frankston, Dandenong and Ringwood, and further out Melton, Sunbury and Werribee, became centres of manufacturing, retailing and administration. As a result, industrial employment in the old working class inner suburbs declined, with these areas rapidly gentrifying in the 1990s and 2000s.

By the end of the 20th century Melbourne had a population of 3.8 million people.

== 2000s ==
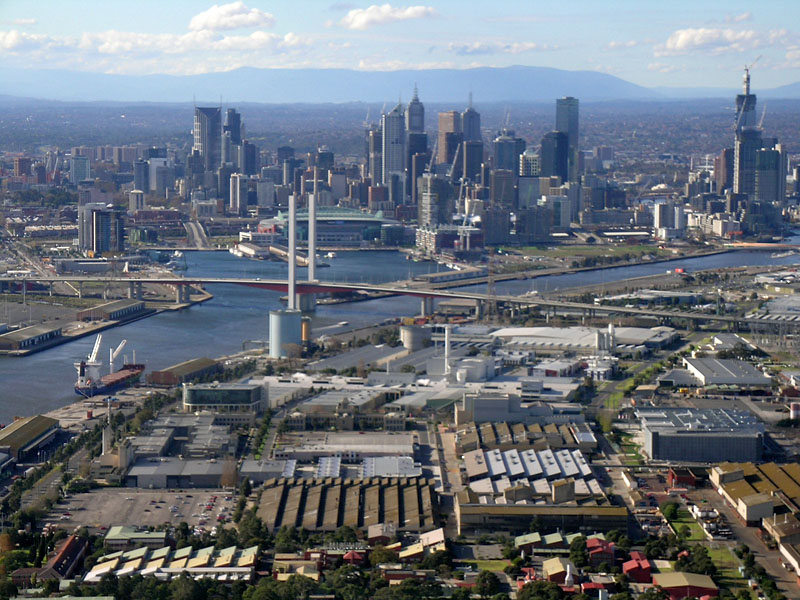
Melbourne from above, 2005. The Eureka Tower, Melbourne's tallest building from 2006 to 2019, is under construction on the far right.

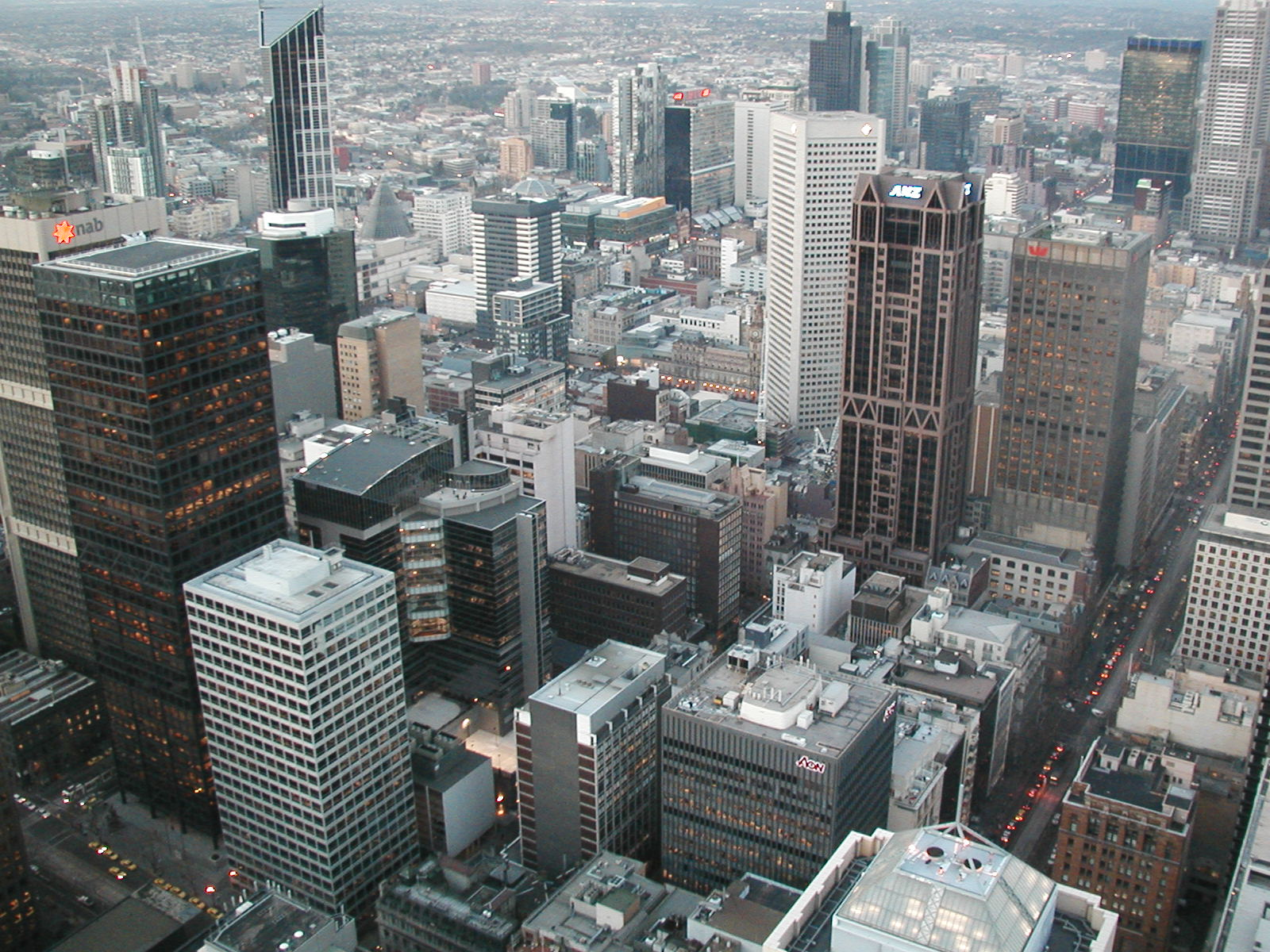
Aerial view of Melbourne's central business district

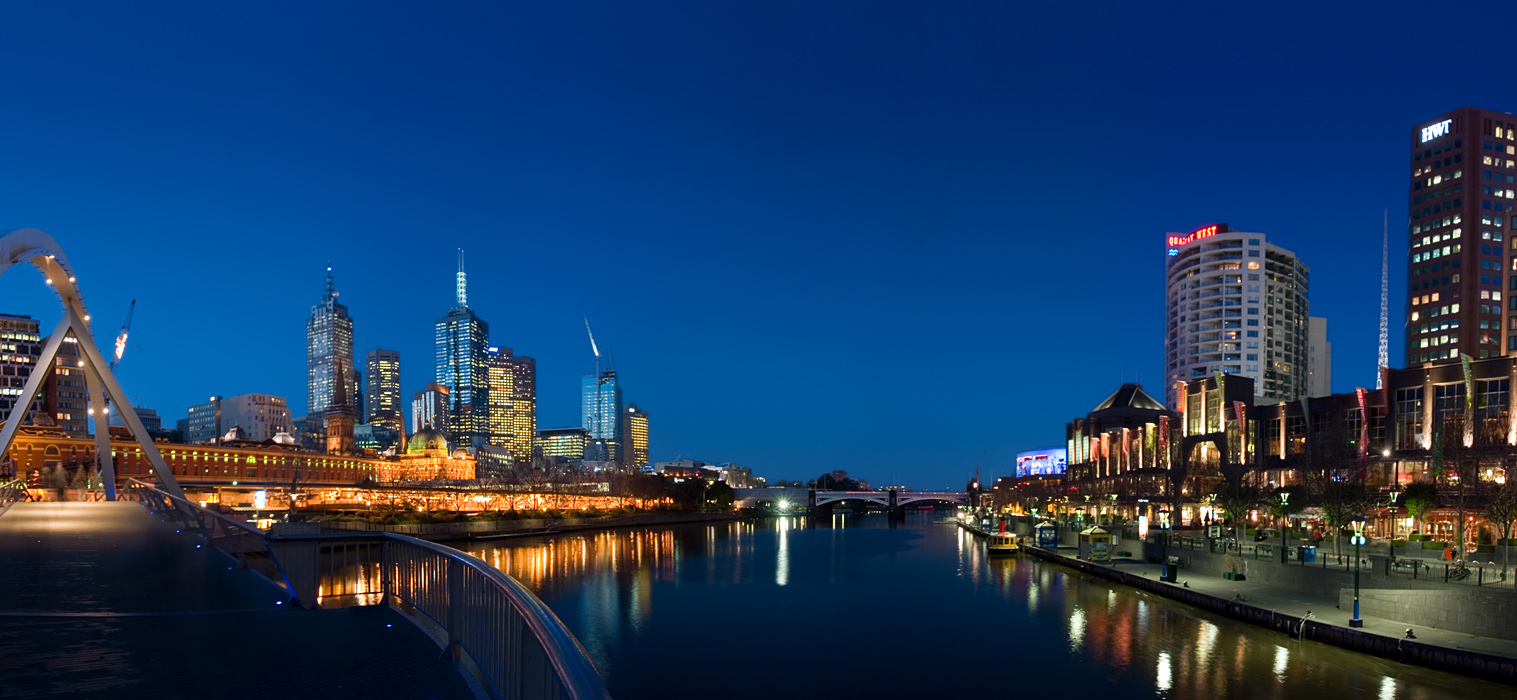
A view of the Yarra River at twilight, with Melbourne's central business district on the left and Southbank on the right

In the early years of the 21st century, Melbourne entered a new period of high economic and population growth under the more cautious Labor government of Steve Bracks, which restored public expenditure on health and education. As the city's suburbs continued to sprawl outwards, the Bracks government sought to restrict new suburban growth to designated growth corridors and encourage higher-density apartment living in the city's main transport hubs.

The city's Central Business District experienced a major resurgence in the 2000s, aided by a large increase in inner-city apartment living, the opening of new public spaces such as Federation Square and the new Southern Cross railway station, a determined marketing campaign by Lord Mayor John So's City Council and continuing development of the Southbank and Docklands precincts.

Since the late 2000s, population growth in Melbourne has been accelerating. Since the early 20th century, the city has been expanding outwards with low-density suburban urban forms to accommodate population growth. In 2009 the Victorian Government announced plans to extend the city's urban growth boundary, potentially rezoning green wedges and agricultural land for housing development.

Since 1997, Melbourne has maintained significant population and employment growth. There has been substantial international investment in the city's industries and property market. Major inner-city urban renewal has occurred in areas such as Southbank, Port Melbourne, Docklands and South Wharf. According to the Australian Bureau of Statistics, Melbourne sustained the highest population increase and economic growth rate of any Australian capital city in the three years ended June 2004.

Despite lack of a progressive economy, general lack of government funding for public services such as public transport, and continued unsustainable urban growth, the city has seen sustained growth in its cultural institutions such as art, music, literature, performance, etc., as many contributors to and patrons of the arts relocate to Melbourne amongst excellent independent community support structures such as press and radio and a thriving cultural community. In 2003, Melbourne was named as a UNESCO City of Literature and the city hosts the majority of Australia's contemporary festivals, events and institutions, new galleries, music venues, museums, of all shapes and sizes are opening across the city.

From 2006, the growth of the city extended into "green wedges" and beyond the city's Urban growth boundary. Predictions of the city's population reaching 5 million people pushed the state government to review the growth boundary in 2008 as part of its Melbourne @ Five Million strategy. Melbourne survived the 2008 financial crisis better than any other Australian city. In 2009, more new jobs were created in Melbourne than any other Australian capital – almost as many as the next two fastest growing cities, Brisbane and Perth, combined. and Melbourne's property market remained strong, resulting in historically high property prices and widespread rent increases.

== 2010s–2020s ==
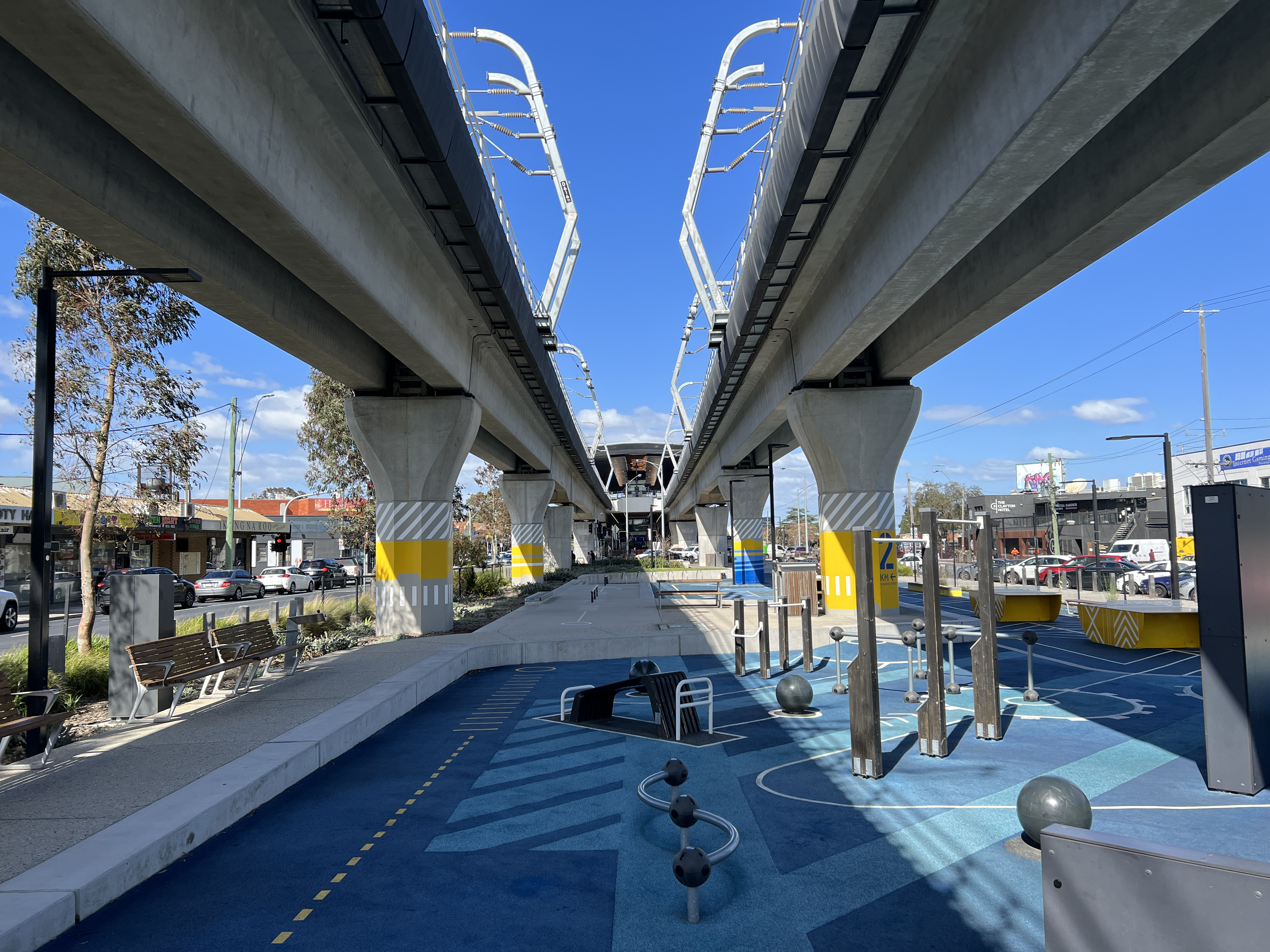
Recreational space created under Clayton railway station in Melbourne's east by the Level Crossing Removal Project

Beginning in 2014 the State Government of Daniel Andrews initiated a number of major infrastructure projects designed to reduce congestion in Melbourne, improve public transport and encourage economic growth, including the Metro Tunnel, the West Gate Tunnel, the North East Link, and the Suburban Rail Loop. The Level Crossing Removal Project, a State Government program of works to remove 110 level crossings, reshaped suburbs across Melbourne by removing rail crossings, rebuilding stations and sometimes allowing for urban renewal. Other major infrastructure initiatives included the Victorian School Building Authority and the rebuilding of Footscray Hospital. Planning for a Melbourne Airport rail link was initiated in 2018 but paused in 2023 due to escalating costs.

Melbourne was voted the world's most liveable city for seven consecutive years from 2011 to 2017 by the Economist Intelligence Unit.

New urban renewal zones were opened up in inner-city areas like Fisherman's Bend and Arden, while suburban growth continued on the urban periphery in Melbourne's outer west and east in suburbs like Wyndham Vale and Cranbourne. Middle suburbs like Box Hill became denser as a greater proportion of Melburnians began living in apartments. A construction boom resulted in 34 new skyscrapers being built in the central business district between 2010 and 2020. In 2020, Melbourne was classified as an Alpha city by the Globalization and World Cities Research Network.

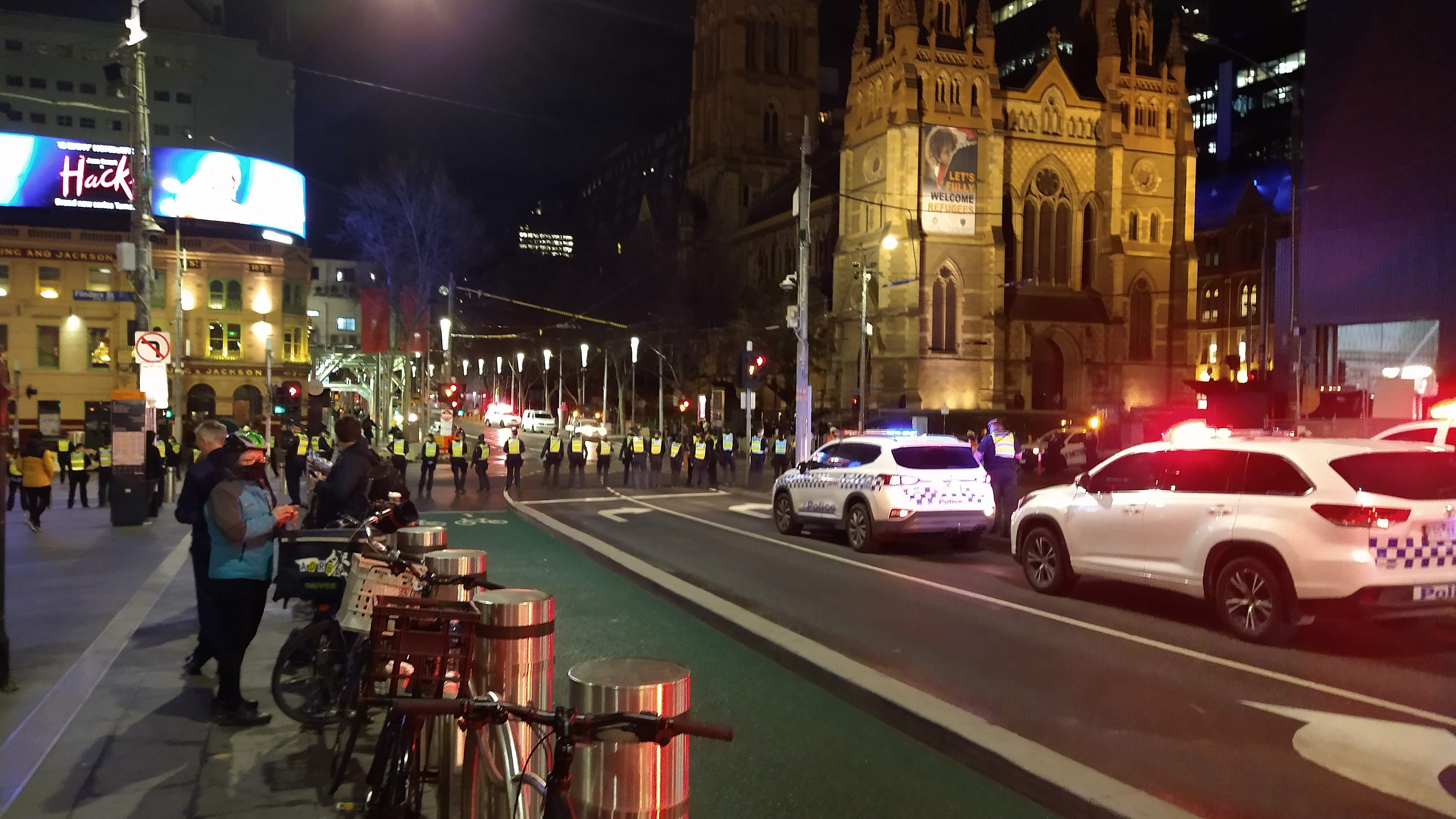
Police presence in Melbourne following a COVID-19 protest on 5 August 2021, upon the announcement of the sixth lockdown of the city.

The COVID-19 pandemic recorded its first Australian case in Melbourne on 25 January 2020. Out of all major Australian cities, Melbourne was the worst affected by the pandemic and spent a long time under lockdown restrictions, with Melbourne experiencing six lockdowns totalling 262 days. The public health policies led to anti-lockdown protests and civil unrest in 2021. While this contributed to a net outflow of migration causing a slight reduction in Melbourne's population over the course of 2020 to 2022, Melbourne is projected to be the fastest growing capital city in Australia from 2023–24 onwards, overtaking Sydney as the nation's largest city in 2029–30 at just over 5.9 million, exceeding 6 million people the following year.

== See also ==
- Aboriginal sites of Victoria
- Culture of Melbourne
- History of Australia
- History of Victoria
- Timeline of Melbourne history
