= Murrundindi =

Australian indigenous leader

- Relatives: William Barak

Ngurungaeta of the Wurundjeri people
- Incumbent
- Assumed office February 2006; 20 years ago
- Preceded by: James Wandin

Murrundindi, is the ngurungaeta of the Wurundjeri people and a descendant of William Barak. He succeeded James Wandin in this position in February 2006.

Murrundindi and his brother Warendj regularly conduct cultural education programs in pre-schools, primary and secondary schools throughout Melbourne. They visit schools regularly and present the diversity of their Aboriginal culture to the children through song, dance, language, and music. Murrundindi also does educational work at Healesville Sanctuary, who nominated him for a reconciliation award in 1997.

== Battle of Yering ==
On 13 January 2007, Murrundindi unveiled a plaque and pictograph at Yarra Flats Billabongs commemorating the Battle of Yering on 13 January 1840.
