= Henry Fyshe Gisborne =

English-born Australian bureaucrat and socialite

- Born: Henry Fyshe Gisborne; 1813
- Died: 21 April 1841, aged 27; At sea
- Occupation: Public servant
- Known for: Commissioner for Crown Lands of the Port Phillip District, founder of Flemington Racecourse and petitioner for Victoria's separation from New South Wales

Henry Fyshe Gisborne (1813–1841) was the first commissioner for Crown Lands of the Port Phillip District, founder of Flemington Racecourse and petitioner for Victoria's separation from New South Wales.

== Early career ==
Henry Fyshe Gisborne was the son of Thomas Gisborne the Younger and Elizabeth Fysche Palmer, daughter of John Palmer. He was educated at Harrow, Eton and Trinity College, Cambridge, which he left without obtaining a degree.

He left England due to ill health and travelled to Australia, landing in Sydney in 1834. In 1837 Gisborne was dispatched by Governor Bourke as police magistrate to Wellington, in the recently colonised Australian hinterland beyond the Blue Mountains where he attempted to keep the peace among early settlers and the native Wiradjuri.

== In Victoria ==
In 1839 Governor Gipps appointed Gisborne Commissioner of Crown Lands of the Port Phillip District. Gisborne's official activities included scouting the hitherto little explored areas of central Victoria. Gisborne led his detachment of Border Police troopers in a skirmish known as the 'Battle of Yering' (no recorded loss of life on either side) at which the Wurundjeri chief Jaga Jaga (also known as Jackie Jackie) was captured, only to be rescued following the diversionary tactics of his colleagues.

When not out on expedition, Gisborne's contribution to early Melbourne society included penning articles for local paper and patronising the Melbourne Club. His social activities attracted unfavourable notices from Governor Gipps, but this displeasure was overlooked by Gisborne's immediate superior, Superintendent (later Governor) Charles La Trobe. Gisborne's most notable contributions to the fledgeling city were moving the site of Melbourne's turf meetings to their current location by the Maribyrnong River at Flemington Racecourse, donating the first books to the Mechanics' Institute (now the Athenaeum Library) and in June 1840 drafting and delivering the first petition for the separation of the Port Phillip District to Governor Gipps.

In 1841, in ill health, Gisborne sailed from Sydney for England. He died between the Cape of Good Hope and Saint Helena on 21 April 1841 at the age of twenty-seven.

== Places named after Gisborne ==
- Gisborne, Victoria - named by Governor La Trobe
- Gisborne Street - behind Parliament House, Melbourne, in recognition of the first petition for Victorian separation
