= Battle of Yering =

Indigenous Australian Frontier War

- Part of Australian Frontier Wars
Date	13 January 1840
Location	Yering, Victoria, Australia.
Result	Border Police victory

Belligerents
United Kingdom of Great Britain and Ireland: (United Kingdom) Colony of New South Wales; Border Police of New South Wales; (British Empire) British colonists	Wurundjeri people

Commanders and leaders
Captain Henry Gisborne	Jaga Jaga

Units involved
Border Police of New South Wales New South Wales Mounted Police	

Strength
3+	Approximately 50

Casualties and losses
None	Unknown

The Battle of Yering was a conflict between Indigenous Australians of the Wurundjeri nation and the Border Police which occurred on 13 January 1840, on the outskirts of Melbourne.

== Frontier conflict ==
The conflict arose after a quarrel between Wurundjeri-william people and settler, James Anderson, over the right to harvest a potato crop on Wurundjeri land at what is now known as Warrandyte. A stand-off occurred and the clansmen moved to William Ryrie's Yering Station. Troopers of the Border Police and a contingent of New South Wales Mounted Police led by Captain Henry Gisborne, who was Commissioner of Crown Lands, lured Jaga Jaga (Jacky-Jacky) and some of the Wurundjeri men to Yering station homestead where Jaga Jaga was captured and handcuffed. The other Wurundjeri men quickly retreated.

Wurundjeri men then approached the homestead with muskets and spears, whereupon Gisborne and his troopers mounted a counterattack, during which several shots were exchanged, the Wurundjeri choosing to retreat into the nearby billabongs. Having lured the troopers away as a diversion, other warriors approached the homestead and freed Jaga Jaga.

No white settlers or troopers were injured in the exchange, and injuries on the part of the Wurundjeri are unknown.

Gisborne later wrote to Superintendent (later Governor) Charles La Trobe saying "I am unable to account for their never having hit us as they are capital marksmen". There was no investigation of the incident initiated, no charges laid, and the incident was passed over.

Jaga Jaga, was also known as Bor-rer bor-rer and was the nephew of Billibellary, a ngurungaeta of the Wurundjeri people.

== Commemoration ==
On 13 January 2007 at the Yarra Flats Billabongs the Shire of Yarra Ranges with Murrundindi, ngurungaeta of the Wurundjeri people, unveiled a historical plaque and pictograph commemorating the Battle of Yering 167 years previously. The plaques were organised by The Friends of the Yarra Flats Billabongs in conjunction with Yarra Ranges Friends in Reconciliation and Nillumbik Reconciliation Group.
