= Matilda House (activist) =

Australian indigenous activist (born 1945)

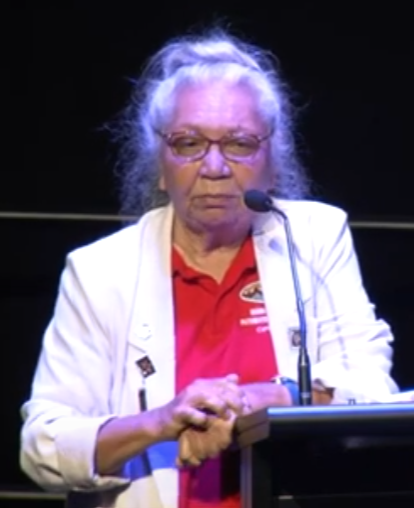
- At an ANU panel discussion in 2023
- Born: Matilda Williams House; 1945 (age 80–81); Cowra, New South Wales, Australia
- Occupation: Elder

Matilda Williams House is an Australian activist and advocate for the rights of Aboriginal Australians. She is an elder of the Ngambri-Ngunnawal people of the Canberra region.

House was born in 1945 on the Erambie Aboriginal Reserve at Cowra, New South Wales (NSW), and raised in her grandfather’s house at Hollywood Aboriginal Reserve in Yass, NSW. When she was 12, House spent a year in Parramatta Girls' Home. House was one of ten children.

House identifies as belonging to the Ngambri-Ngunnawal family group (also referred to as Ngambri-Ngunnuwal family group), which has been formally recognised by the Australian Capital Territory (ACT) Government as having historical connections to the Canberra region and surrounds, particularly the region around Namadgi National Park. Black Harry Williams, also known as Ngoobra, House’s great-grandfather, and Harry Williams her grandfather, both identified as Ngambri.

There remains a dispute over whose "rights to country" belong to in the ACT, with the ACT Government issuing formal protocols regarding recognition of the traditional owners of the land on which Canberra is located, in response to a request from the United Ngunnawal Elders Council.

House returned to Canberra in 1963 and has been actively involved in Indigenous Affairs in the Canberra region since 1967.

House is the chair of the Ngambri Local Aboriginal Land Council in Queanbeyan, NSW, which she established with her brothers in 1984, and the Joint Chair of the Interim Namadgi National Park Committee. She assisted in establishing the Aboriginal Legal Service in the 1980s, and has continued more recently through her membership of the Aboriginal Justice Advisory Committee.

House has performed numerous welcoming ceremonies, including notably the first Welcome to Country to be held at the Australian Parliament at the opening of the 42nd Parliament of Australia.

House has also served on the first ACT Heritage Council, the United Ngunnawal Elders Council, the Queanbeyan Regional Council of the Aboriginal and Torres Strait Islander Commission (ATSIC), the Ngambri Local Aboriginal Land Council, the Tent Embassy Advisory Committee and the ACT Aboriginal and Torres Strait Islander Community Consultative Council. She has also acted as an ACT honorary ambassador.

House's involvement in Indigenous Affairs led to her delivering the welcome at Australians for Native Title and Reconciliation's "Sea of Hands" installation, and contributing to the 'Bringing Them Home' report into the Stolen Generations. She was also one of the original protestors who established the Aboriginal Tent Embassy in 1972.

House was named Canberra Citizen of the Year by ACT Chief Minister Jon Stanhope MLA in 2006.
