= Welcome to Country =

Australian land acknowledgement ritual

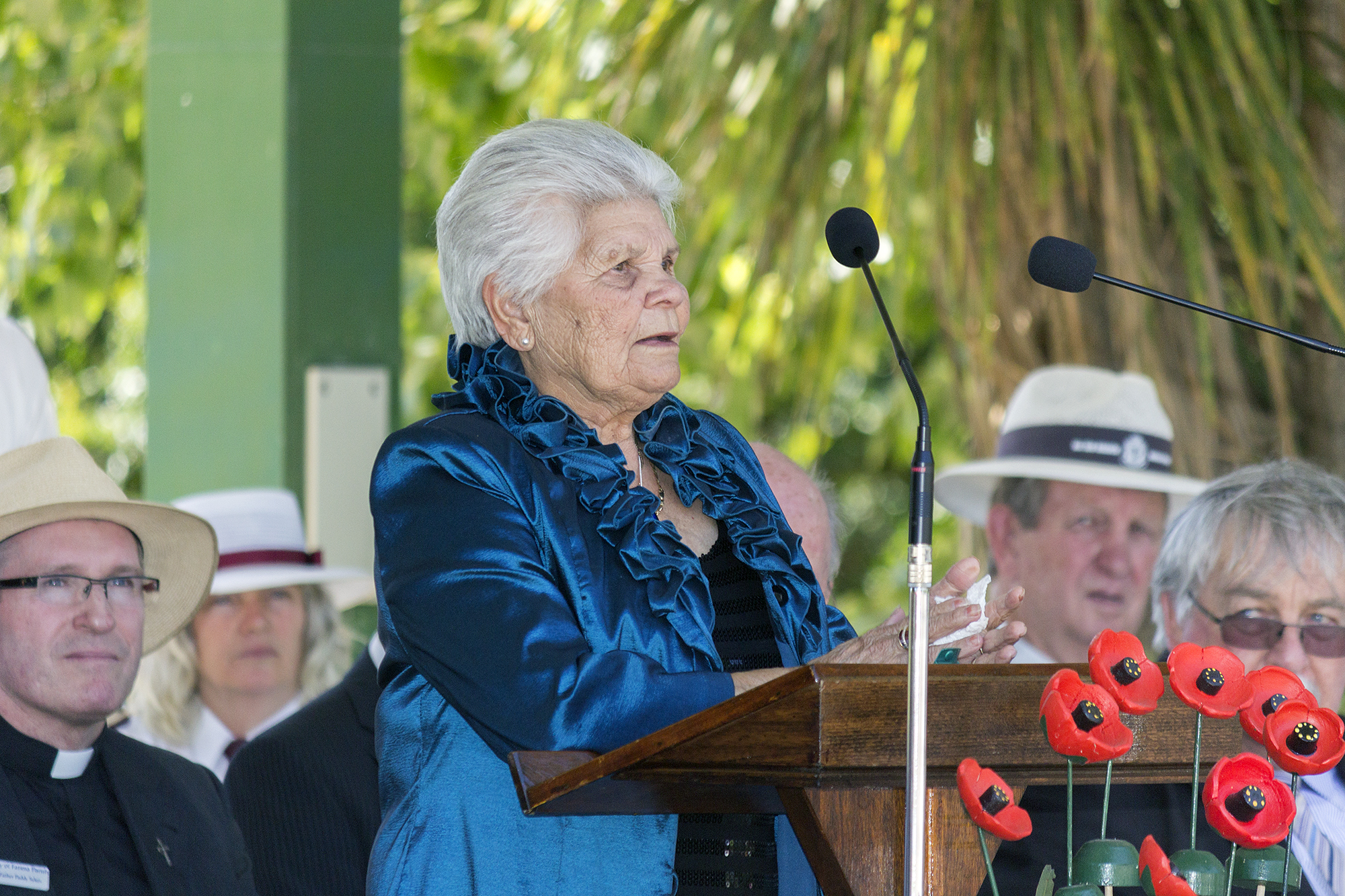
Wiradjuri elder Isabel Reid giving the Welcome to Country

A Welcome to Country is a ritual or formal ceremony performed as a land acknowledgement at many events held in Australia. It is intended to highlight the cultural significance of the surrounding area to the descendants of the particular Aboriginal or Torres Strait Islander clan or language group who are recognised as the original human inhabitants of the area. Welcomes are performed by a member of the recognised group. They are sometimes accompanied by traditional smoking ceremonies, music or dance. An Acknowledgement of Country is a similar land acknowledgement ritual performed when a recognised owner is not available to perform the welcome, or the traditional owners are not known.

Prior to European settlement, when Aboriginal people travelled onto the land, or Country, of another Aboriginal nation, a ceremony was performed as an act of diplomacy, and to show that the travellers were welcome. A similar ceremony was first performed in contemporary times at the 1973 Aquarius Festival, with a Welcome performed by Uncle Lyle Roberts Jr. and songman Uncle Dickee Donnelly and again in 1978 by Richard Walley to a group of Māori performers in Perth. In the 1980s arts executive, actress, and playwright Rhoda Roberts coined the contemporary term Welcome to Country for the ceremony, which soon gained widespread acceptance, being performed at the openings of arts events.

Since 2008, a Welcome to Country has been incorporated into the ceremonial opening of the Parliament of Australia, occurring after each federal election.

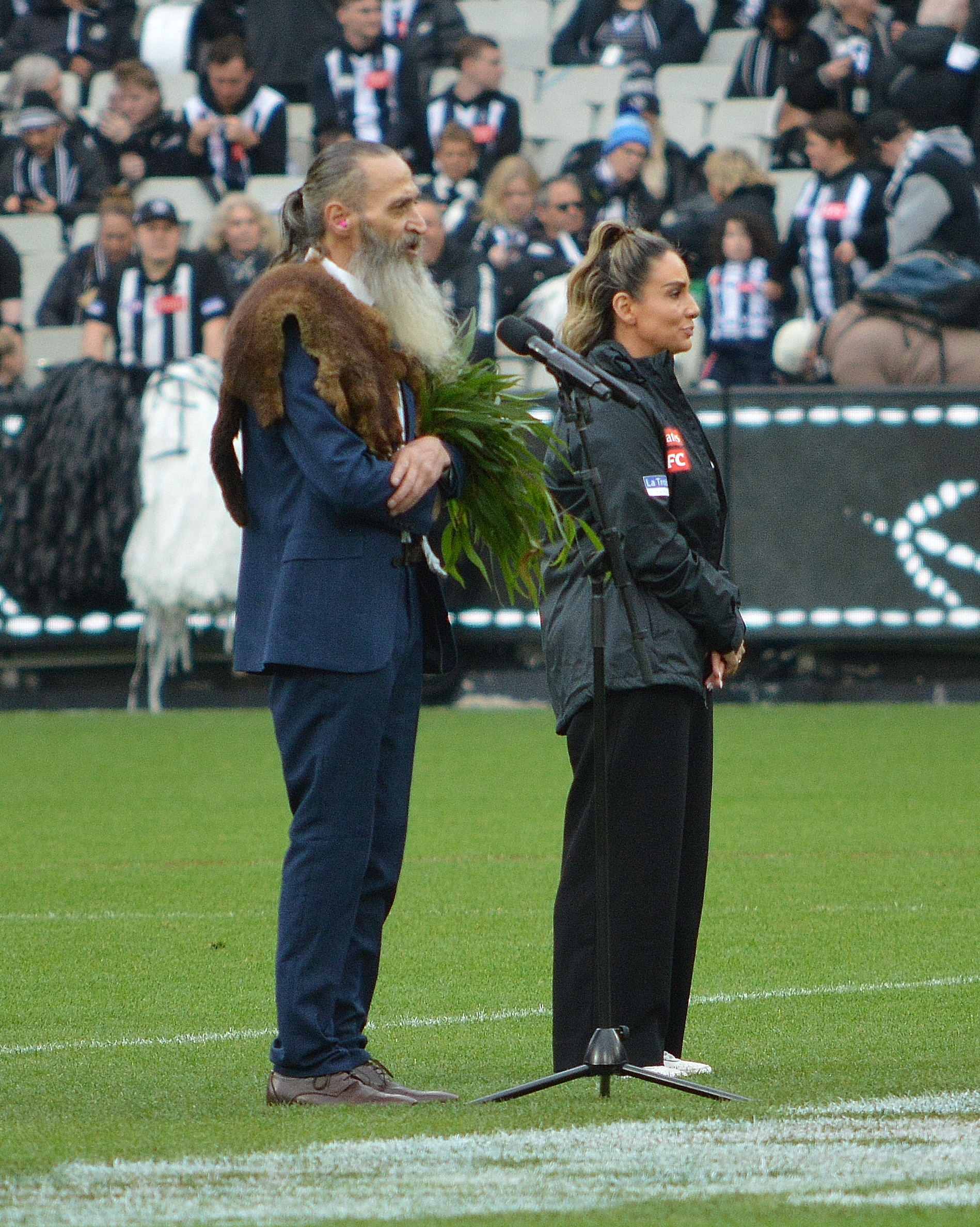
Uncle Colin Hunter performs a Welcome to Country before the round 10, 2025 AFL match between Collingwood and Adelaide Crows at the MCG

== History ==
=== Aboriginal history and relationship with land ===
In Aboriginal culture prior to European settlement, each clan's survival was dependent upon its understanding of food, water and other resources within its own country – a discrete area of land to which it had more or less exclusive claim. When other Aboriginal people travelled onto another nation's land, a ceremony was performed to determine whether the travellers were peaceful and then to show that the travellers were welcome. A smoking ceremony may have been used to transfer the scent of the home tribe onto the visitors in order to indicate to others the travellers had been welcomed and to avoid animals fleeing at a strange scent.

The term Country has a particular meaning to many Aboriginal peoples, encompassing an interdependent relationship between an individual or a people and their ancestral or traditional lands and seas. Before the colonisation of Australia, the land contained a number of different language groups, nations, and estates, with overlapping responsibilities for the land. The connection to land involves culture, spirituality, language, law/lore, kin relationships and identity. The Welcome to Country has been a long tradition among Aboriginal Australian groups to welcome peoples from other areas. Today it serves also as a symbol which signifies the recognition of Aboriginal and Torres Strait Islander peoples' presence in Australia before colonisation and an end to their past exclusion from Australian history and society, aiding to reconciliation with Australia's First Nations.

Connection to Country means more than just the land or waters in Aboriginal culture. There is no equivalent in the English language to describe that which permeates all aspects of existence: culture, spirituality, language, law, family and identity. Aboriginal people did not own land as property in the past, but their relationship to an area of land provides a deep sense of "identity, purpose and belonging" and is a relationship of reciprocity and respect. "Country includes all living things ... It embraces the seasons, stories and creation spirits." The history of a people with an area ("country") can go back for thousands of years and the relationship with the land is nurtured and sustained by cultural knowledge and by the environment. Disconnection from the land can impact health and wellbeing. This connection is also reflected in such phrases as "caring for country" or "living on country" and related to the importance of land rights and native title. Indigenous groups have also had some of their legal rights that arise under their traditional laws and customs recognised in the form of native title, since the Mabo judgment and the passage of the Native Title Act 1993.

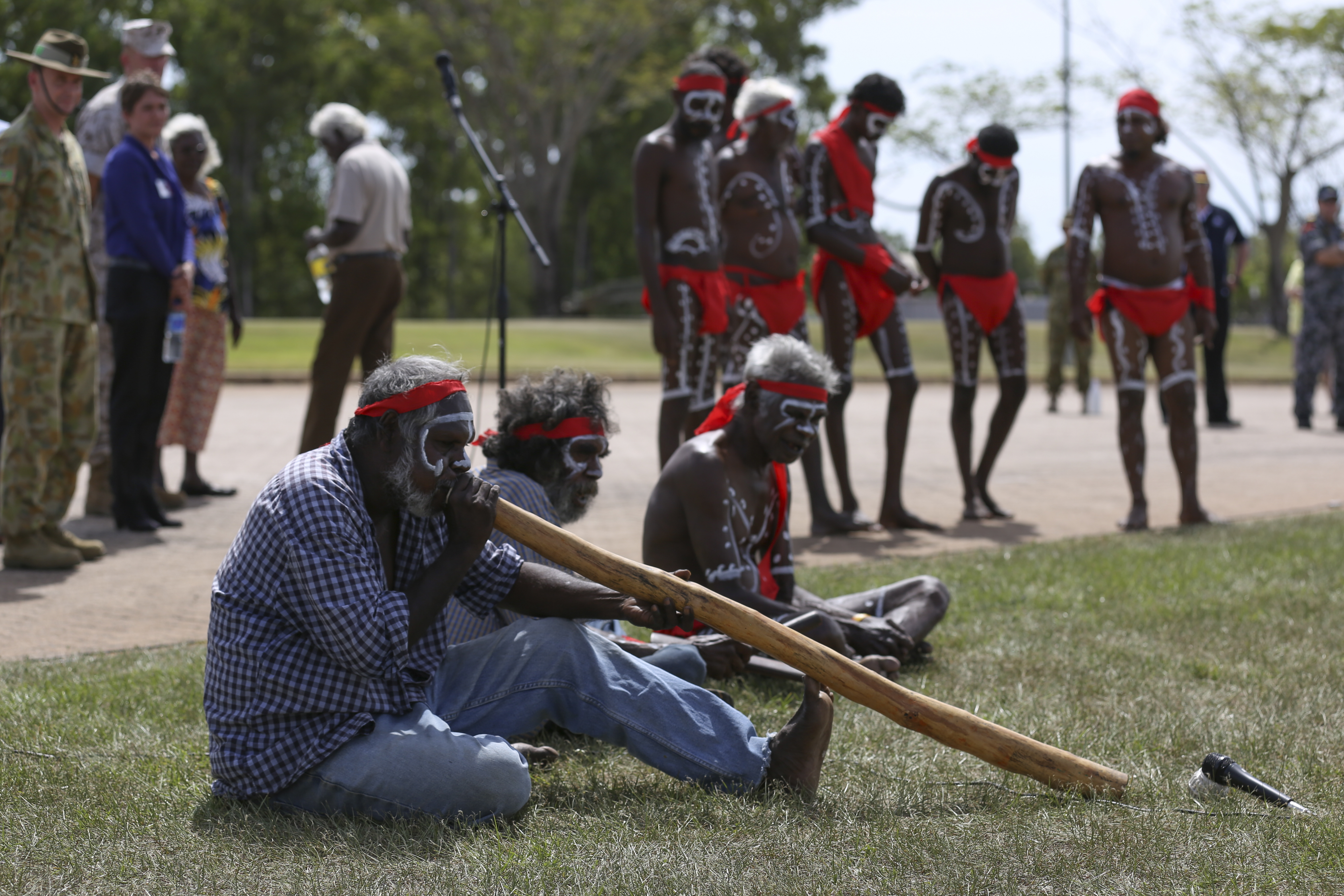
Greeting the U.S. Marines of 1st Battalion, 4th Marine Regiment, Marine Rotational Force at Darwin with a Welcome to Country at the brigade parade ground, 22 April 2015 at Robertson Barracks

=== Evolution of the greetings ===
Welcomes are a form of Aboriginal ceremony used to welcome other peoples from other areas and as a cultural exchange. It is seen as a way of making newcomers feel comfortable and connected, and may be the basis for forging important future relationships. The ancient tradition was noted in colonial records. In the 1840s, Assistant Protector of Aborigines in the Port Phillip District William Thomas observed Tanderrum ceremonies among Kulin peoples. He recorded acts of diplomacy to receive strangers, in which gifts were exchanged and visitors given safe access to Country.

The 1973 Aquarius Festival held in Nimbin, New South Wales, on Bundjalung Country by the Australian Union of Students, has been documented as Australia's first publicly observed Welcome to Country, although it was not called this at the time. Organisers of the alternative lifestyle festival, considered Australia's "Woodstock", were challenged by Indigenous activist Gary Foley to seek permission from traditional owners to hold the festival on their land. The ceremony was conducted by Uncle Lyle Roberts and songman Uncle Dickee Donnelly. Lyle Roberts was the uncle of arts executive and actress Rhoda Roberts, who later said that she regarded this as the first Welcome being exercised in a contemporary setting, under new circumstances.

The second recorded Welcome to Country occurred in 1976, when entertainers Richard Walley and Ernie Dingo developed a ceremony to welcome a group of Māori artists who were participating in the Perth International Arts Festival. The welcome, extended on behalf of the Noongar people and with the permission of Noongar elders, was intended to mirror the visitors' own traditions, while incorporating elements of Aboriginal culture. Walley recalled that Māori performers were uncomfortable performing their cultural act without having been acknowledged or welcomed by the people of the land.

I asked the good spirits of my ancestors and the good spirits of the ancestors of the land to watch over us and keep our guests safe while they're in our Country. And then I talked to the spirits of their ancestors, saying that we're looking after them here and we will send them back to their Country.

— Richard Walley

Rhoda Roberts coined the term Welcome to Country in the 1980s and helped develop both welcomes and acknowledgements to country by beginning each show she was involved with a Welcome. Some contested the term, wanting to insert a "the" or "our" before the word "Country"; however, Roberts' firm view was that the Country "is not ours. We live with it". Playwright Wesley Enoch later observed "Underneath that small grammatical decision sits an entire philosophy. Country is not scenery or real estate. It is a living system of relationships between people, ancestors, animals, plants, waters, seasons, story, memory and obligation. We do not stand outside those relationships as owners. We belong within them". Enoch credited Roberts with "help[ing to] give the practice the language that became part of the national vocabulary... Through festivals, broadcasting, the Festival of the Dreaming, cultural institutions and events of enormous national visibility", until it played a central part in the ceremony of the 2000 Sydney Olympics.

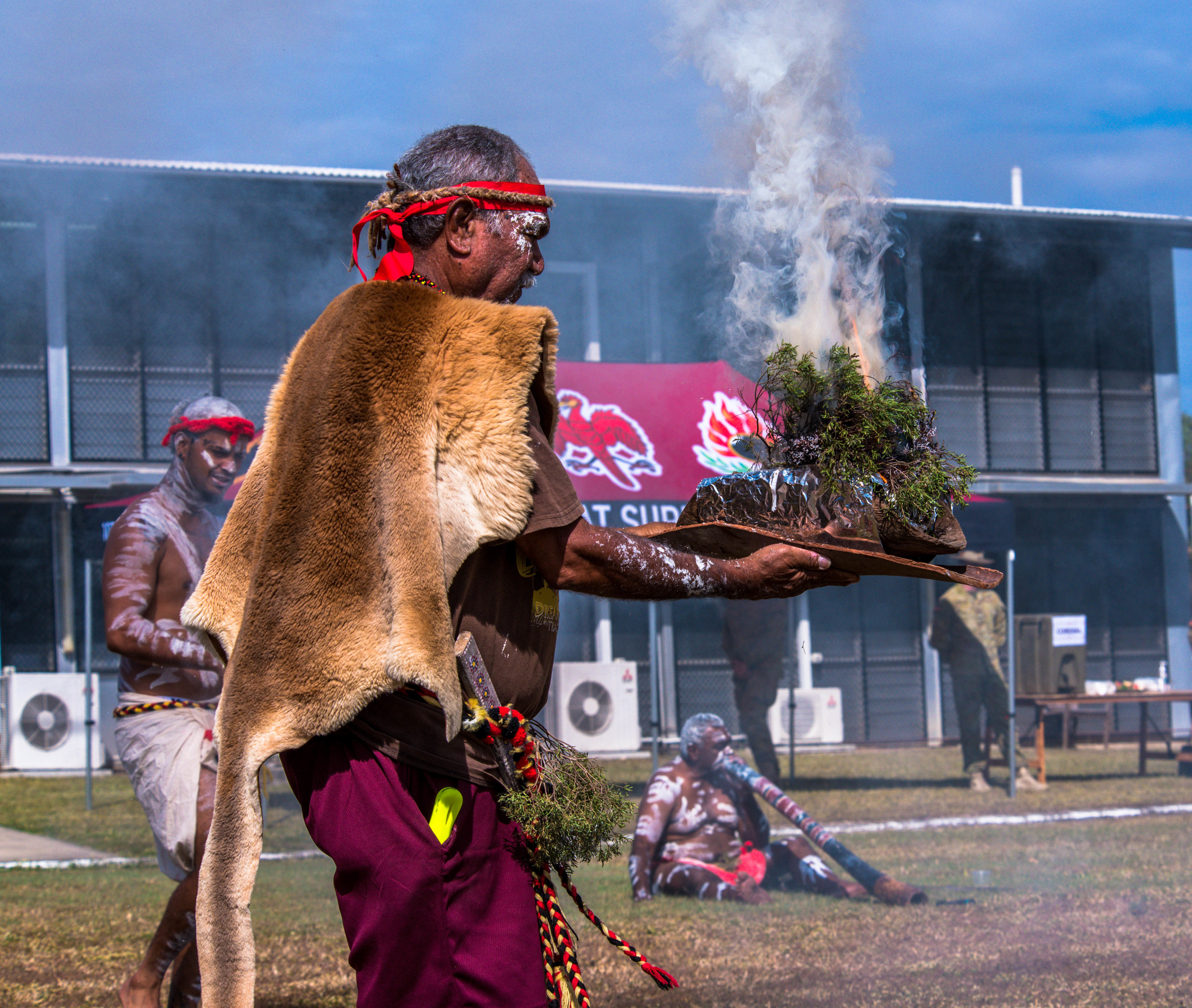
Bindal Elder, Uncle Alfred Smallwood, performs the smoking ceremony at a Welcome to Country during Exercise Talisman Sabre 2021 at Lavarack Barracks, Townsville, Queensland, 19 July 2021

Acknowledgements of Country are a more recent development, associated with the Keating government of the 1990s, the reconciliation movement and the creation of the Council for Aboriginal Reconciliation (CAR) with Yawuru man Pat Dodson as chair. After the Mabo case, in which the historical fiction of Australia being terra nullius was overturned and native title was recognised in Australia. According to Yorta Yorta and Dja Dja Wurrung man Tiriki Onus, head of the Wilin Centre for Indigenous Arts and Cultural Development at the University of Melbourne, it was after Mabo that Acknowledgement of Country grew among "grassroots communities concerned with issues of reconciliation". Wiradjuri woman Linda Burney, a member of CAR in those days, has said that there was no formal strategy to bring the Acknowledgement of Country into Australian life, but it just grew organically and became accepted as part of many types of gatherings. It was seen as a good way to engage people with Aboriginal and Torres Strait Islander people and culture and that the wider Australian community feels that its important to have a good relationship with Australia's Indigenous peoples.

Welcomes and acknowledgements have since been incorporated into openings of meetings and other events across Australia, by all levels of government, universities, community groups, arts and other organisations.

In 2008, a Welcome to Country was performed at the ceremonial opening of the Parliament of Australia and the following day Prime Minister Kevin Rudd made the Apology to Australia's Indigenous peoples. Since then it has been incorporated into the opening of parliament which occurs after each federal election. The welcome includes a speech as well as traditional music and dance. Given that parliament sits in Canberra, traditionally part of Ngambri and Ngunnawal country, a Ngambri/Ngunnawal elder officiates.

== Significance ==
Aboriginal and Torres Strait Islander peoples were largely excluded from Australian history books and from the democratic process in Australia for the first two centuries of white settlement, since the colonisation of Australia from 1788. Including recognition of Indigenous peoples in events, meetings and national symbols is seen as one part of repairing the damage caused by exclusion from settler society. Incorporating Welcome or Acknowledgement protocols into official meetings and events "recognises Aboriginal and Torres Strait Islander peoples as the First Australians and Traditional Custodians of land" and shows respect for traditional owners.

== Description ==
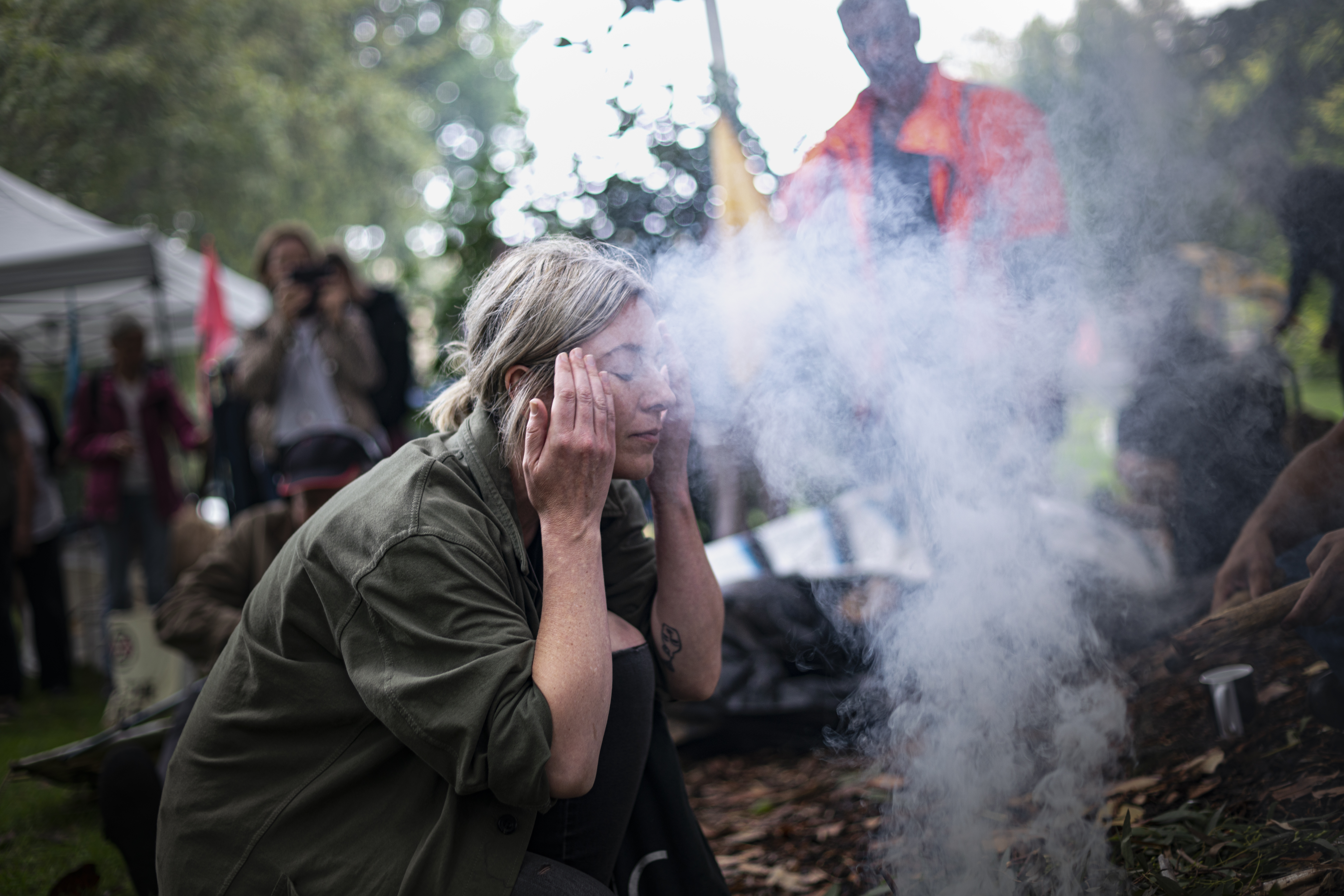
Welcome to Country and smoking ceremony led by Wurundjeri elder Uncle Bill Nicholson Jnr in Melbourne

Both Welcomes and Acknowledgements recognise the continuing connection of Aboriginal traditional owners to their country, and offer appropriate respect as part of the process of reconciliation and healing. As they have become more commonplace and people have become used to hearing them, efforts are being made by many to keep the words alive and make them meaningful to become core Australian customs. They may be used to inform and educate as well as being entertaining at the same time.

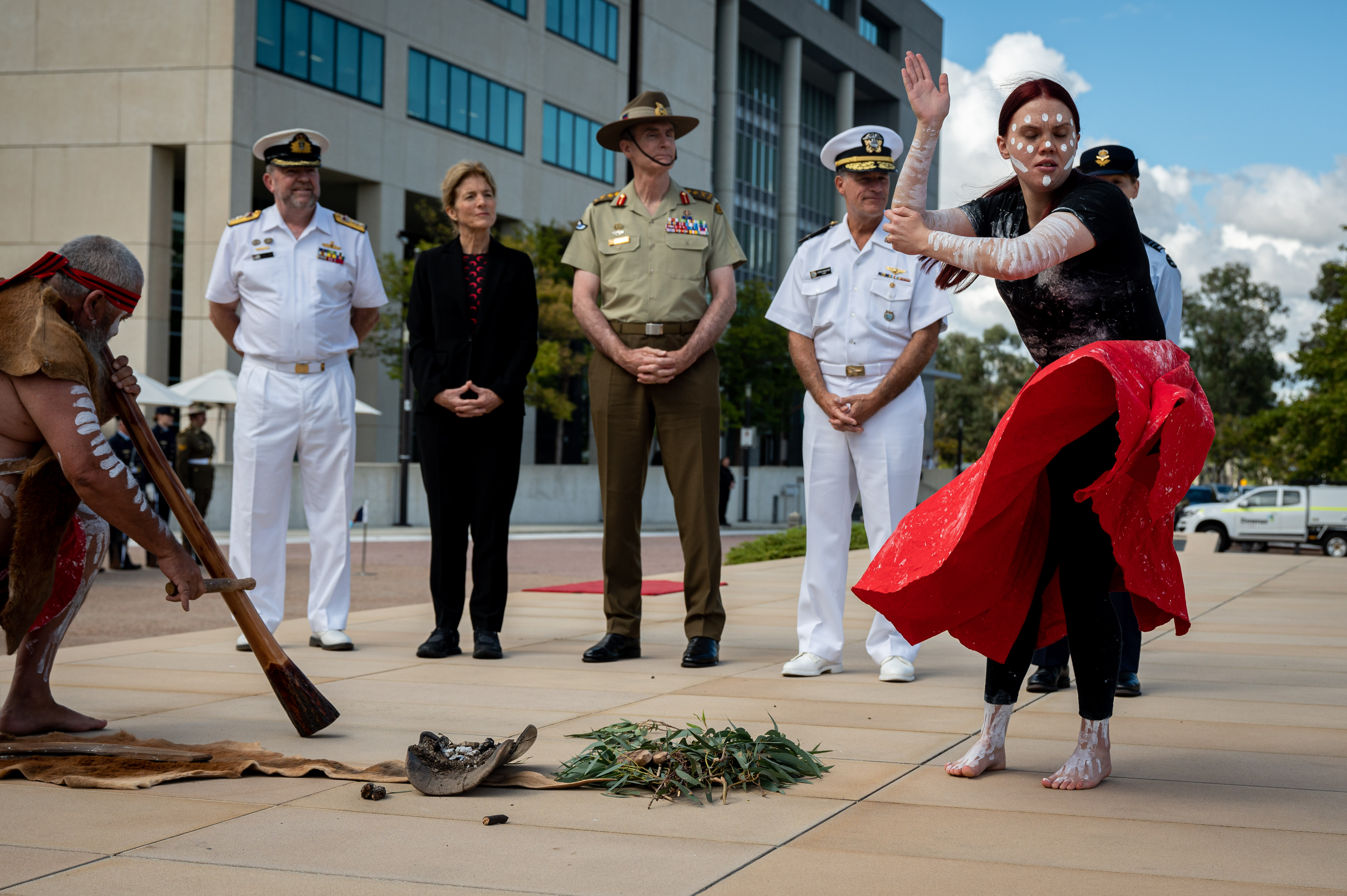
Welcome to Country for US ambassador to Australia Caroline Kennedy, with Gen. Angus Campbell and Adm. John C. Aquilino on the right

=== Welcome to Country ===
The Victorian Government advised that Welcomes are advised for major public events, forums and functions in locations where traditional owners have been formally recognised. A Welcome to Country can only be undertaken by an elder, formally recognised traditional owner or custodian to welcome visitors to their traditional country. The format varies; it may include a welcome speech, a traditional dance, and/or smoking ceremony.

Sydney's fireworks show has incorporated a Welcome to Country since the 2015–16 event to acknowledge the territory of Port Jackson as territory of the Cadigal, Gamaragal, and Wangal bands of the Eora people. This ceremony takes the form of a display that contains imagery, music, and pyrotechnic effects inspired by Aboriginal culture. Since New Year's Eve 2022, the concept has been expanded to encompass the entirety of the 9 p.m. "Family Fireworks" show, whose soundtrack is curated by an Aboriginal artist or musicians.

=== Acknowledgement of Country ===
If a local elder is not available, or if the traditional owners have not been formally recognised for the area, an Acknowledgement of Country, also known as Acknowledgement of Traditional Owners, performed by the host of the event, is appropriate. If there is no formal recognition of traditional ownership, it is advised to limit recognition to an Acknowledgement of Traditional Owners generally, without making a reference to the name of any specific traditional owners.

The Victorian Government's wording for recognised traditional owners:

Our meeting/conference/workshop is being held on the lands of the [Traditional Owner's name] people and I wish to acknowledge them as Traditional Owners. I would also like to pay my respects to their Elders, past and present, and Aboriginal Elders of other communities who may be here today.

And for unknown traditional owners:

I acknowledge the Traditional Owners of the land [or country] on which we are meeting. I pay my respects to their Elders, past and present, and the Elders from other communities who may be here today.

The City of Adelaide's wording is (specifically tailored for the local Kaurna people):

City of Adelaide acknowledges that we are meeting on the traditional country of the Kaurna people of the Adelaide Plains and pays respect to Elders past and present.

We recognise and respect their cultural heritage, beliefs and relationship with the land. We acknowledge that they are of continuing importance to the Kaurna people living today.

And we also extend that respect to other Aboriginal Language Groups and other First Nations.

The words "always was, always will be Aboriginal land" are sometimes included in Acknowledgement of Country, as acknowledgement that the land of Australia was never ceded.

==== Other countries ====
Similar acknowledgements, e.g. land acknowledgements, have become common at public events in Canada and have begun to be adopted by Native American groups in the United States.

== Criticism ==
The Welcome to Country and Acknowledgement of Country have become culture wars issues and attracted criticism from conservative figures, some of whom suggest that such ceremonies are a form of tokenism and do not reflect traditional Aboriginal culture. Critics have included historian Keith Windschuttle and politicians Tony Abbott; Peter Dutton; Jacinta Price; and Pauline Hanson. Since the defeat of the 2023 Australian Indigenous Voice referendum, conservative politicians and commentators have used the Welcome to Country rituals as a focal point to oppose or scale down Indigenous Reconciliation, arguing the use is divisive and a waste of taxpayers' money. Some in Aboriginal communities have also expressed issues with the rituals, arguing that the repetition has caused it to lose meaning.

In 2023, the General Assembly of the Presbyterian Church of Australia ruled that Acknowledgements of Country were inappropriate at church services because their wording "almost invariably carries overtones of an Indigenous spirituality inconsistent with Christian belief" and that "final ownership of land" is vested in the Creator. However other churches, such as the Uniting Church, practise an Acknowledgement to Country, "seek[ing] to be a healing community, characterised by the love of Christ".

== In popular culture ==
The Australian band Midnight Oil released a single in August 2020 entitled "Gadigal Land", whose lyrics include a play on the traditional Welcome to Country as a critical review of Aboriginal history. Starting with the line "Welcome to Gadigal land", it goes on to mention other things brought by foreign settlers, like poison, grog, and smallpox.
