= Smoking ceremony =

Aboriginal Australian custom

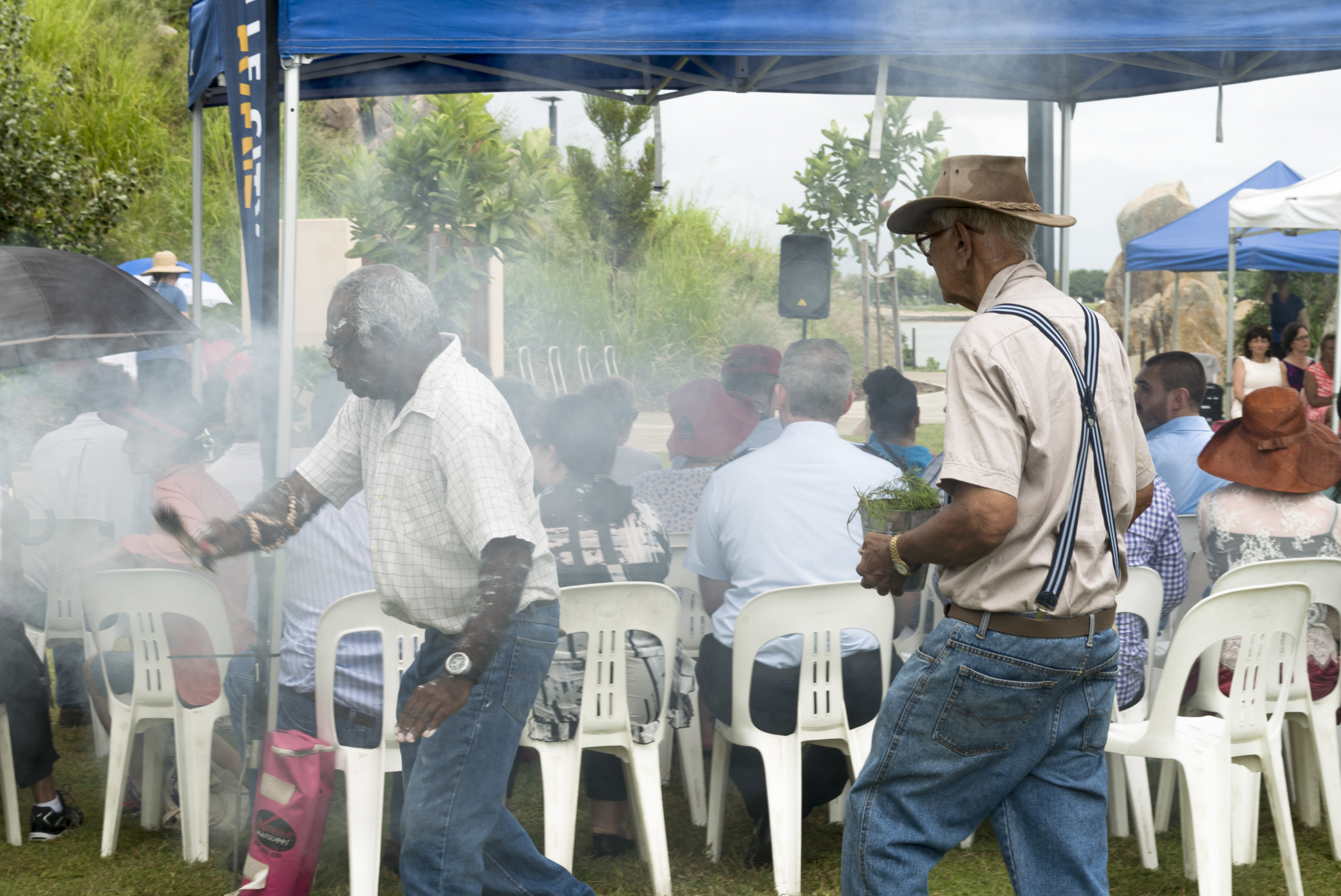
Smoking ceremony during Aboriginal Welcome to Country in Townsville, Queensland

Smoking ceremony is an ancient and contemporary custom among some Aboriginal Australians that involves smouldering native plants to produce smoke. This herbal smoke is believed to have both spiritual and physical cleansing properties, as well as the ability to ward off bad spirits. In traditional, spiritual culture, smoking ceremonies have been performed following either childbirth or initiation rites involving circumcision. In contemporary culture, elements of smoking ceremonies have been incorporated into Welcome to Country performances and other spiritual events held for the general public.

Research has shown that heating the leaves of Eremophila longifolia (commonly known as the berrigan emu bush), one of the plants used in the smoking ceremony, produces a smoke with significant antimicrobial effects. These effects are not observed in the leaves prior to heating. Fumigating a newborn infant, a mother who has just given birth, or a boy who has just been circumcised, is considered to assist in preventing infection.

== Cultural significance ==
Smoking ceremonies are done at key milestones throughout one's life, depending on the traditions of each Indigenous nation. Smoke may also be created by lighting a fire of paperbark, then smouldering green leaves atop the flame. The fire may be created in a pit in the ground, in the area itself or in a bucket.

=== Birth ===
Smoking ceremonies may be performed at birth to welcome a newborn into the community and ensure that the mother and child will both be healthy throughout their lives. It is considered ‘baby business’ and is thus the responsibility of women in the community. Aspects of the practice have specific sacred meanings. In the Darug nation, smoking the feet represents a connection to country; the chest represents the connection between heart, family and country; the hands the spiritual imperative to take only what's needed from the land; and the mouth the Indigenous language.

=== Initiation ===
Some Indigenous groups in Central Australia perform circumcision or subincision on boys as they come of age to welcome them into adulthood, marking the beginning of their involvement with men's business. Smoking ceremonies are thus integrated into the initiation ceremony to encourage both spiritual and physical cleansing. Smoking leaves of the emu bush serves a dual purpose of cleansing one's spirit to connect them to their country and sterilising instruments used in the circumcision itself.

=== Death ===
Smoking ceremonies are conducted in a deceased person's space to aid their spirit in moving on from the material world and purify or cleanse a location. The ceremony takes precedence over all other events and may involve smoking a deceased person's house, room or car to allow their spirit to return to country. Depending on the Indigenous Nation, smoking may be accompanied by sweeping of branches across a location, which is said to weaken the connection between the dead and living world and may have replaced the practice of burning the clothes and belongings of the deceased. Community members may also paint ochre on the living spaces inhabited by the dead, which serves the dual purpose of encouraging the spirit to move on and notifying the community that someone has died.

If it occurs in an enclosed space, the practice itself is altered slightly. A small fire may be built within the home, or a bucket of smoking coals may be brought into the house.

== Gundungurra ceremonies ==
The Gundungurra people, whose country includes NSW’s Jenolan Caves, smoking ceremonies, or Numbuk Yabbun, have traditionally been used to communicate when one was leaving or entering country as well as to provide spiritual cleansing.

== Welcome to Country ==
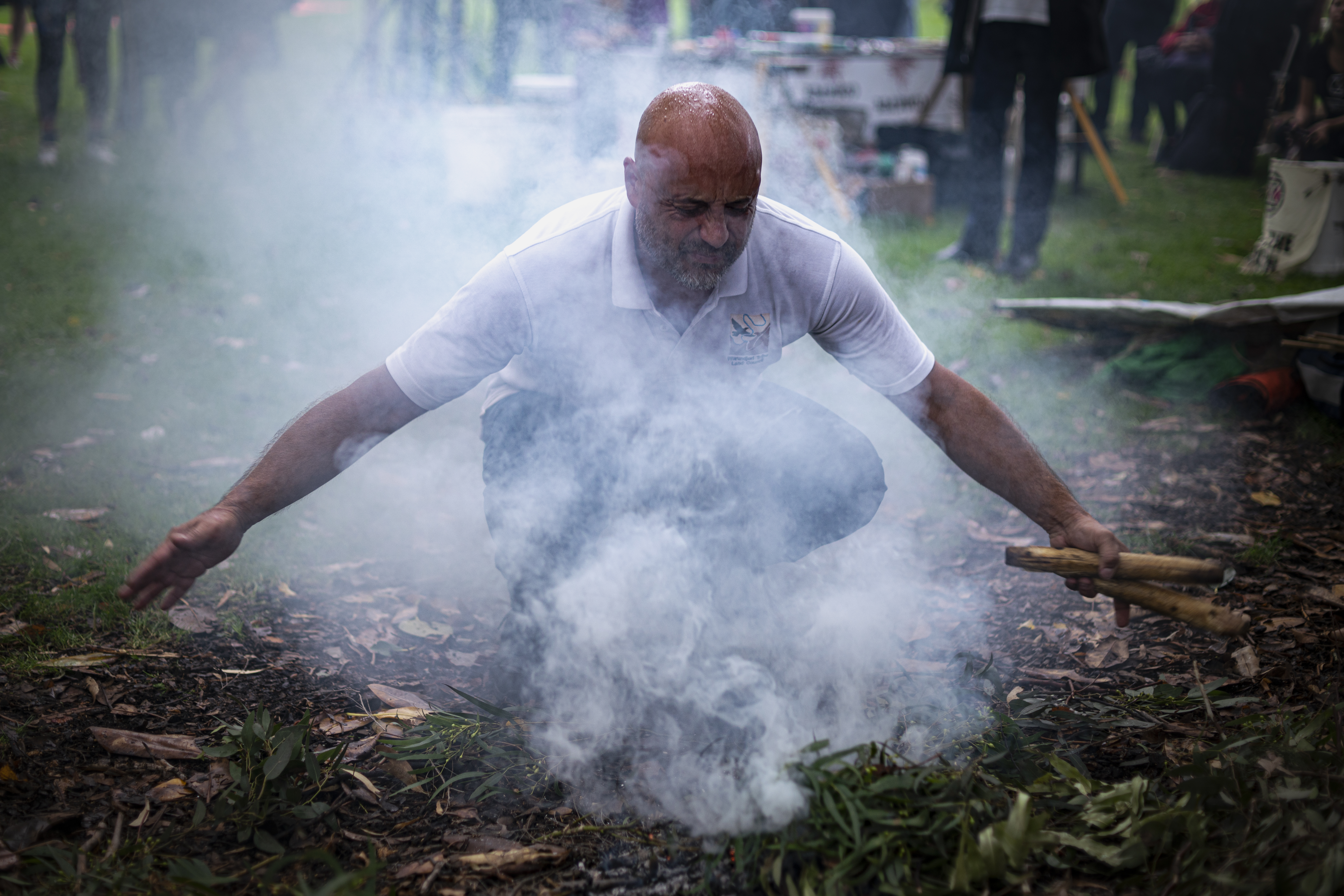
Welcome to Country smoking ceremony performed by an Aboriginal elder

Smoke and fire have been traditionally used by Indigenous Australians as a form of communication. Individuals light a fire when entering another group's country, signalling their entry to the people who live there, and acting as a call for help when necessary. In the 21st century, smoking ceremonies have become a more frequent occurrence as part of Welcome to Country ceremonies. Welcome to Country ceremonies are part of reconciliation as they acknowledge the traditional ownership of the land and involve Aboriginal Australians in events that take place on their land. Smoking ceremonies are performed by Indigenous elders and community members in an event open to the non-Indigenous Australian public, as opposed to the closed ceremonies performed within a community. While smoking ceremonies are not a universal element of Indigenous cultures, they have been performed across the country by a number of different community elders.

=== Welcome to Country for the Duke and Duchess of Sussex ===
During their 2018 royal visit of Australia, Fiji, Tonga and New Zealand, the Duke and Duchess of Sussex participated in a smoking ceremony to commemorate the unveiling of the Queens Commonwealth Canopy in K’Gari National Park. Butchulla elders performed the ceremony as a Welcome to Country, highlighting the focus on Indigenous forests encouraged by the Queen's Commonwealth Canopy program. It was the first smoking ceremony performed for royalty.

== Other events ==
=== Beatification of Mary Mackillop ===
In 1995 Pope John Paul II beatified the Australian nun Mary Mackillop in Sydney, accompanied by 26 Catholic Aboriginal Australians. Aboriginal Australians performed a smoking ceremony to replace traditional incense burning in Catholic mass, with the Pope making special mention of the presence of Aboriginal Australians throughout Australia's history. Members of the Indigenous community who commented on the event said they saw this as a positive step towards reconciling with the Catholic church.

=== Melbourne Midsumma Festival ===
In 2020 convenors of the Midsumma Festival invited Aboriginal elders to perform a welcome to country ceremony before the march, incorporating a smoking ceremony into the proceedings. They acknowledged the Faces of Aboriginal Pride, elected at the 2019 Victorian NAIDOC Pride Night, Stone Motherless Cold and Astro.

=== Lidia Thorpe's induction into Parliament ===
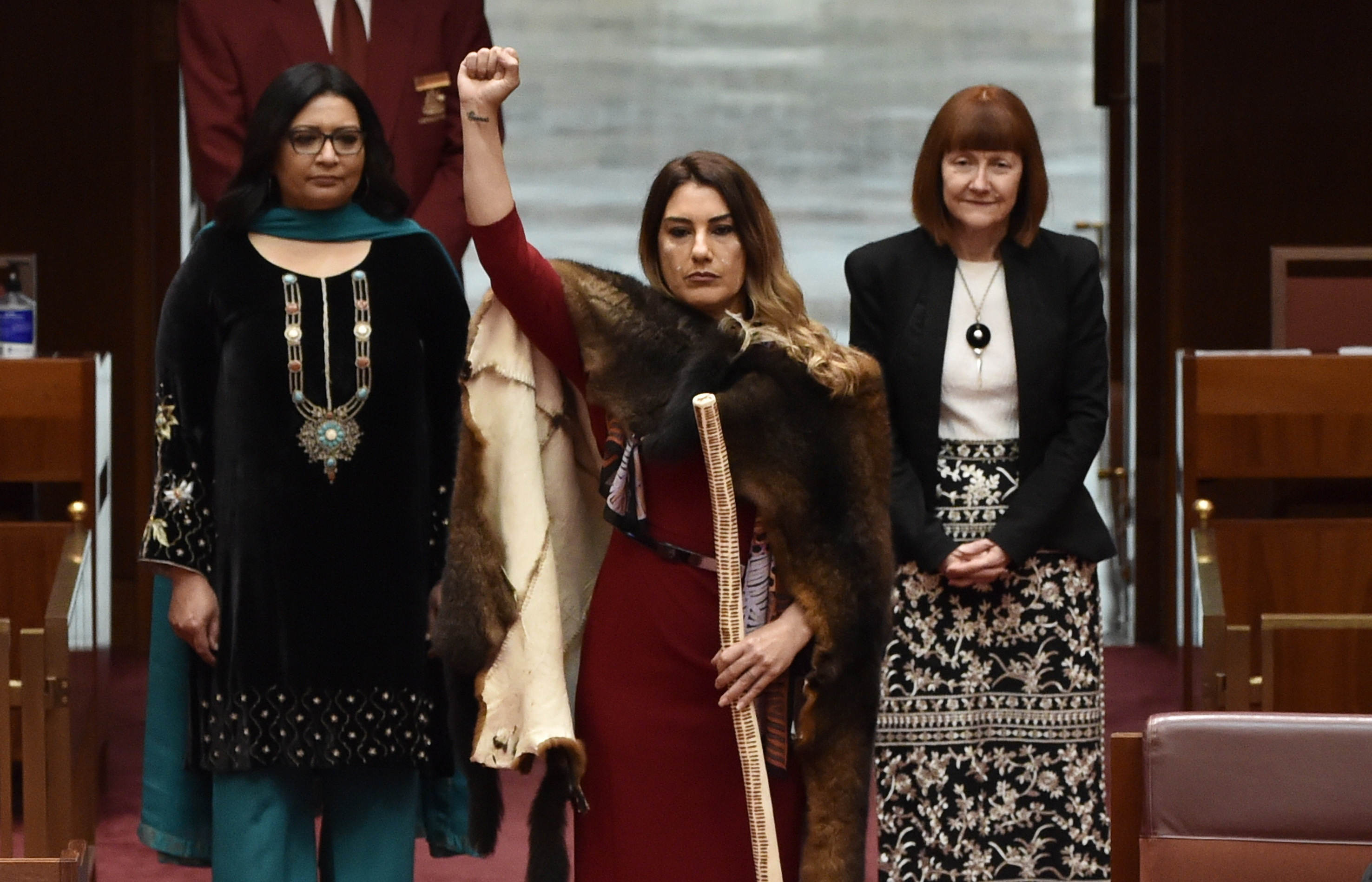
Lidia Thorpe's induction into Parliament in 2020

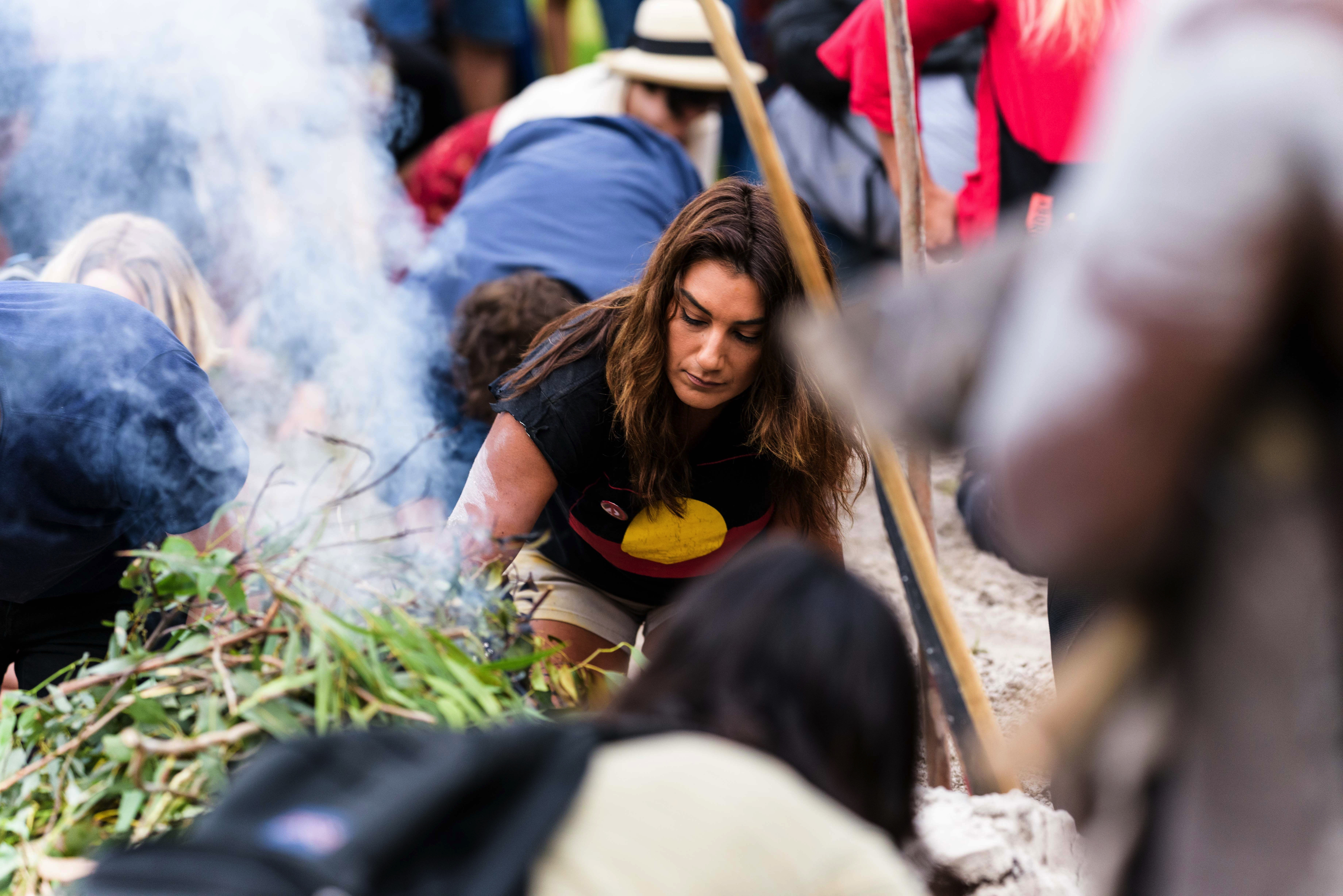
Lidia Thorpe at a smoking ceremony

Upon election to the Victorian Legislative Assembly in 2017, Senator Lidia Thorpe was inducted into her position wearing a traditional possum fur cloak representing her ancestry as a Djab Wurrung Gunnai Gunditjmara woman. Her swearing in included a smoking ceremony as part of a welcome to country.

Thorpe’s later appointment to the federal senate in 2020 included a smoking ceremony at the Aboriginal Tent Embassy. She carried a message stick bearing a mark for each of the 441 Indigenous people who died in custody since the Royal Commission into Aboriginal Deaths in Custody in 1990.

== Biological properties ==
Plants used in smoking ceremonies have various biological properties which, when fumigated, can be beneficial for community members. The chemical components of plants used in smoking ceremonies mean that the ceremonies are not solely spiritual but serve medicinal and physical purposes too. In addition to exposing people to the smoke, surgical tools used in circumcision rituals may also be exposed to the smoke to be disinfected.

=== Emu bush ===
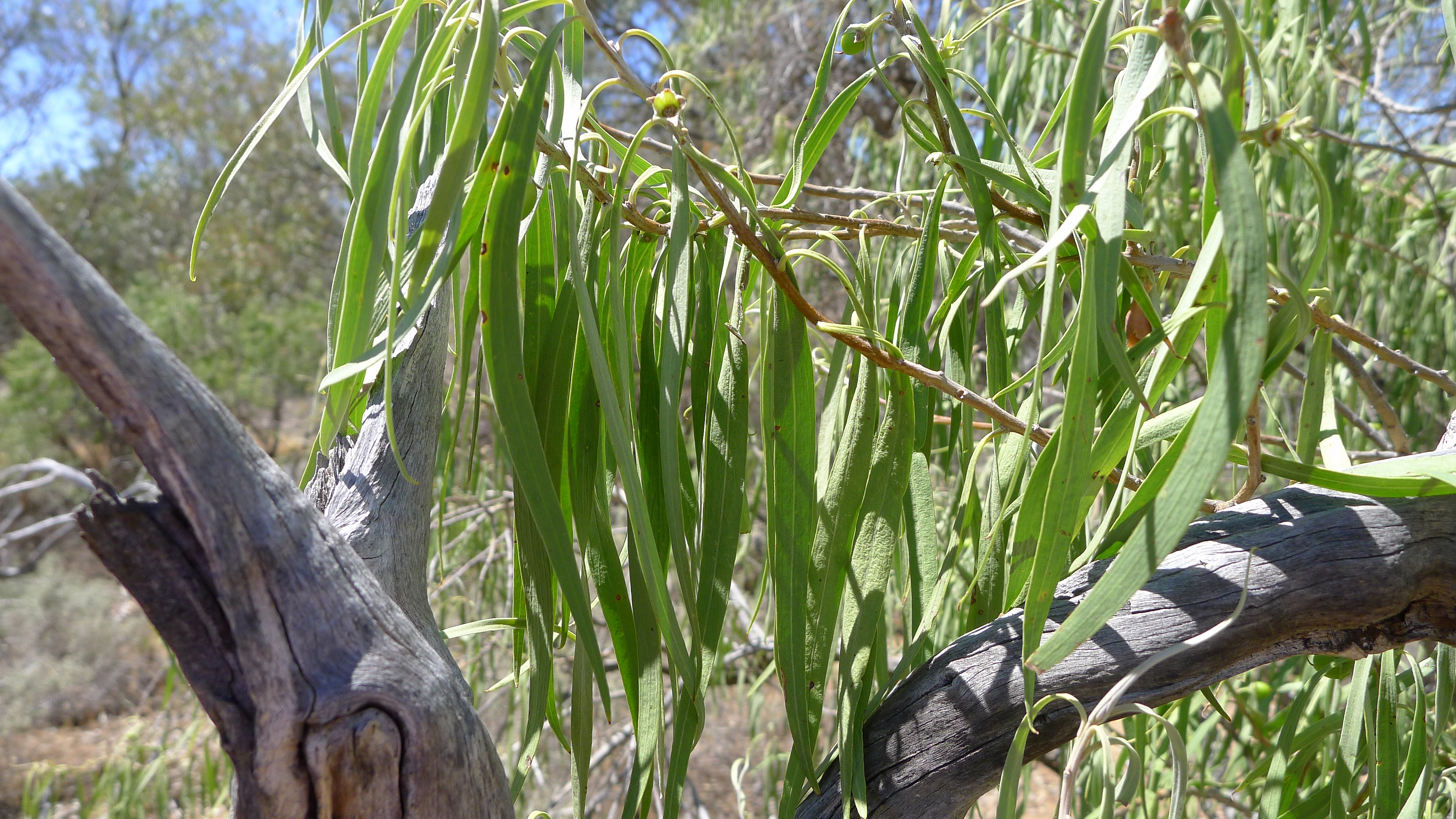
Emu bush leaves, used in smoking ceremonies

Emu bush, otherwise known as berrigan, is a traditional medicine sacred to Aboriginal Australian cultures. Research has shown that there is variation in the quantity and types of essential oils produced by plants across NSW. These chemovariants correlate to different ceremonial uses of the plant. For example, the Western Australian emu bush is a different chemotype which contains some toxic compounds, so Australian sandalwood is more common in ceremonial life.

Temperature is known to affect the antimicrobial activity of beneficial compounds in emu bush. Pyrolysis and burning of the plant also increase the physical benefits of the plant. Medicinal benefits are maximised through elements of the ceremony. Individuals participating in the ceremony are directly exposed to the smoke as the leaves are brought closer to their skin and face, and artefacts are sometimes singed alongside the leaves when used for surgery.

=== Australian sandalwood ===
As with other sandalwood species, Australian sandalwood essential oils are known to be anti-inflammatory and anti-bacterial. While the oils are known to cause skin sensitization in people with allergies, fumigation does not carry the same risks to community members due to the decreased absorption and changes in chemistry that occur upon burning the leaves. Additionally, a randomised controlled trial of 87 women showed evidence that aromatherapy reduced anxiety during image-guided breast biopsy, with sandalwood showing the most significant effect, and one of the compounds within the oil may guard against skin cancer. These physical properties are perceived to bring benefits for Australian Indigenous communities in the various contexts of smoking ceremonies, particularly as smoking ceremonies expose not only the skin but the respiratory tract to the oils.
