= Leioproctus sericeus =

Scientific classification
- Kingdom: Animalia
- Phylum: Arthropoda
- Clade: Pancrustacea
- Class: Insecta
- Order: Hymenoptera
- Family: Colletidae
- Genus: Leioproctus
- Species: L. sericeus

Binomial name
- Leioproctus sericeus Batley, 2025

Species of bee

Leioproctus sericeus, or Leioproctus (Euryglossidia) sericeus, is a species of bee in the family Colletidae and subfamily Colletinae. It is endemic to Australia. It was described by entomologist Michael Batley in 2025.

== Etymology ==
The specific epithet sericeus (Greek: "silky" or "satiny") is an anatomical reference to the metasomal terga.

== Description ==
The female body length is 5.5 mm. Integumental colouration is mainly black, the metasoma satiny, with bronze apical tergal margins. The hair is white to pale brown.

== Distribution and habitat ==
The species occurs in Western Australia. The type locality is Meleya Well on Thundelarra Station in the Murchison region.

== Behaviour ==
The adults are flying mellivores. Flowering plants visited by the bees include Eremophila longifolia, as well as Thryptomene, Keraudrenia and Eucalyptus species.

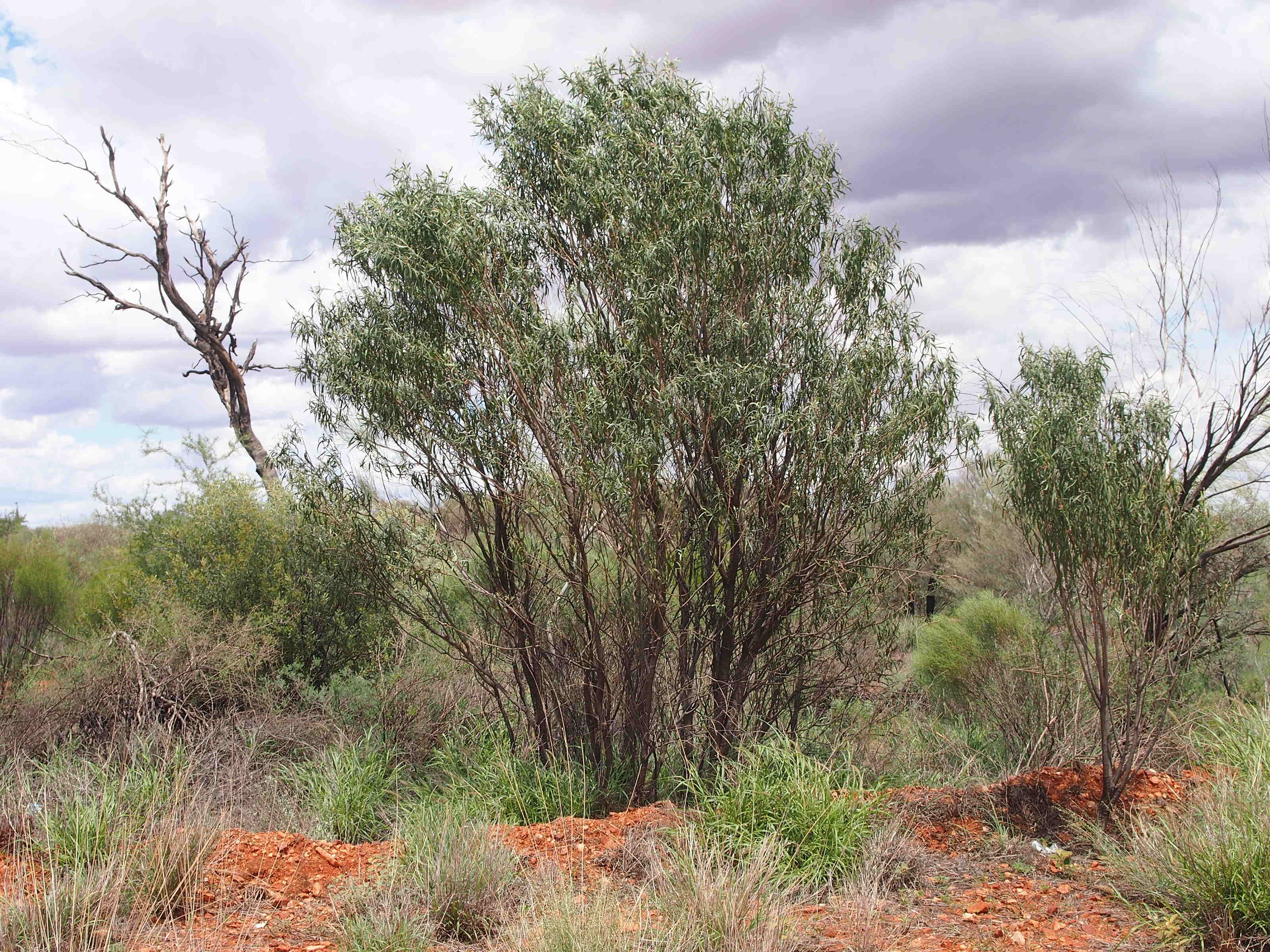
Eremophila longifolia (berrigan), a forage plant of the bees

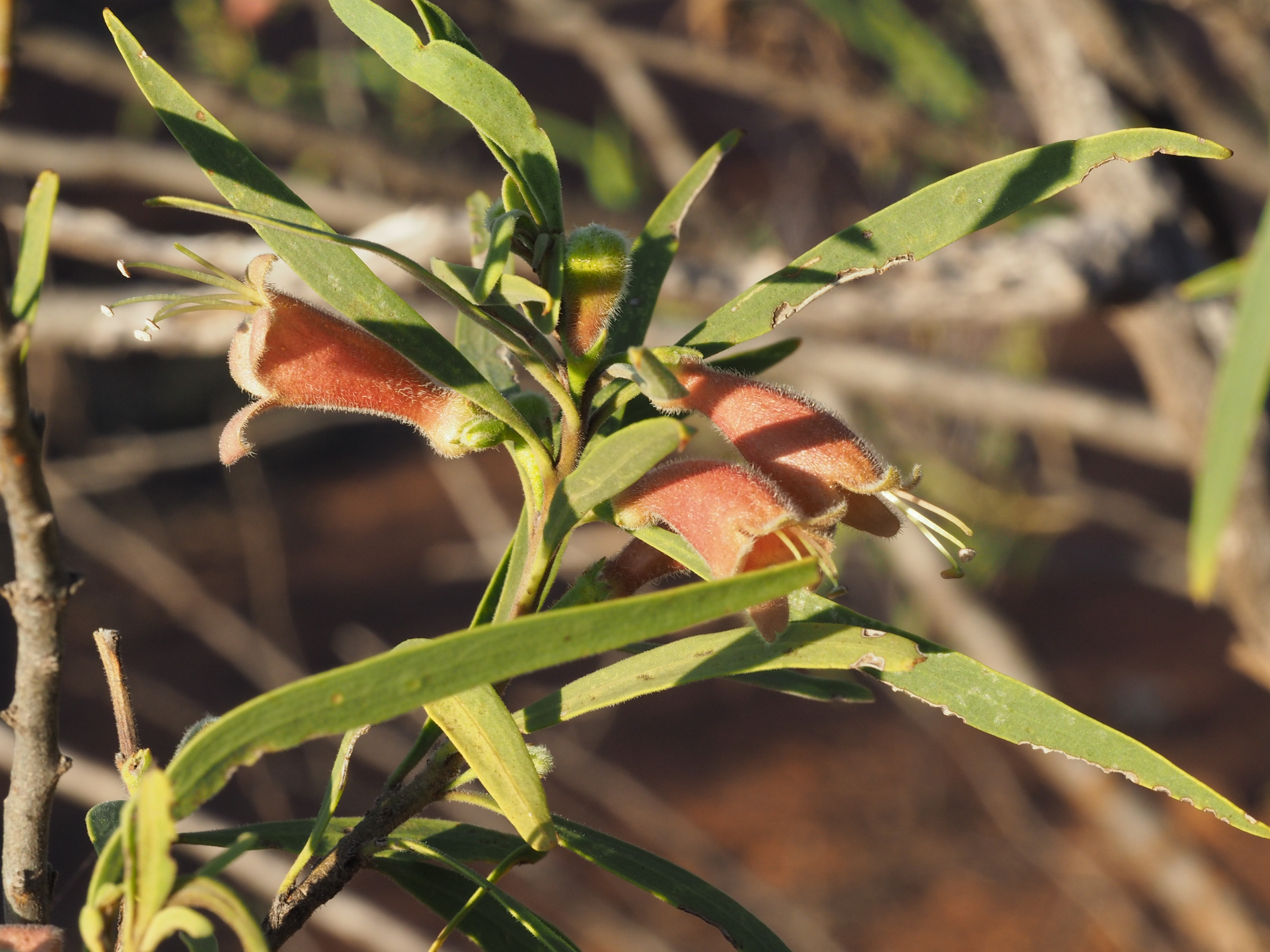
Flowers of Eremophila longifolia
