= Shane Mortimer =

Australian Ngambri elder

- Born: 24 December 1955 (age 70); Belmore, New South Wales, Australia
- Occupations: Ngambri elder, filmmaker and activist
- Parent(s): Jim and Lesley Mortimer

Shane Mortimer (born 24 December 1955) is a Ngambri man with a strong connection to the local Canberra region.

Mortimer was born in Belmore, Sydney in 1955 to parents Lesley and Jim Mortimer. Mortimer lived unaware of his aboriginality until 1989, when he discovered a maternal line going back to Ngambri woman Ju Nin Mingo, daughter of James Ainslie. His grandmother Adelaide McClelland had been taken from her mother Florence Ellen Lowe at the Brungle Mission, prior to the First World War. She was one of the thousands of stolen Aboriginal children to be forcibly removed from their parents under legislation that operated in Australia between 1910 and 1970.

Mortimer has been living in the Canberra area since the early 1990s. In 2009–10 he co-produced his first feature film, Vulnerable, and he is currently working on a 13-part documentary series on native Australian grasslands. He is also Chairman of the Ag-Arts Residency Kenmore Limited.

== Campaigns ==
=== Campaigning against biomass and wind farms ===
Mortimer is an active campaigner against wind farms. He claims that biomass and wind farms are destroying wildlife habitats, adversely impacting on Indigenous communities and do not produce any environmental benefit. He is also concerned the wind power industry has ignored Native Title rights. Mortimer also believes wind farms in the vicinity of Lake George will diminish the fertility of sheep and cattle grazing in the area.

He has supported protests against construction of Cullerin Range Wind Farm, Capital Wind Farm, Crookwell Wind Farm and Gullen Range Wind Farm.

=== Lobbying the Australian War Memorial for greater recognition of Aboriginal Australians ===
Mortimer lobbied Brendan Nelson, Director of the Australian War Memorial, on the Memorial's refusal to depict Australian frontier wars.

=== Lobbying to regenerate Australian indigenous perennial grasses ===
Mortimer argues that, for a sustainable future, native grasslands must be left to regenerate in the Australian Capital Territory (ACT). In 2012 he told the National Indigenous Times that 10 per cent regeneration of the degraded indigenous grasslands in Australia would take more carbon out of the world's atmosphere than has been put there since the Industrial Revolution.

For environmental reasons, Mortimer has unsuccessfully sought to block land developments in the ACT, including the greenfield suburb of Lawson in Belconnen. He also supports urban infill in the territory, suggesting that for environmental reasons the ACT needs to develop housing on top of existing infrastructure instead of building on the fringes of Canberra.

== Civil disobedience ==
=== Illegal parking ===
Mortimer amasses parking tickets, often parking his van illegally in the Australian Capital Territory as an act of civil disobedience; he reasons that because the land is his people's land he should be allowed to park for free.

=== Providing an illegal housing authorisation ===
In 2012, Mortimer issued an 'authorisation certificate' in defiance of ACT laws to a local University student living on a raft in Lake Ginninderra. The certificate stated that the student was 'authorised to occupy Lake Ginninderra or any other lake estuary or wetland he may so choose upon to reside as suits his needs in Ngambri country.'

== Comments on racism ==
In 2012, Mortimer filed a claim for $6 million worth of damages for alleged racism after Professor Don Aitkin, former National Capital Authority chairman, wrote that Mortimer looked "about as Aboriginal as I do". Mortimer sought $500,000 in personal damages and a further $5.5 million to be paid to the not-for-profit of which he is chairman, Agriculture Arts Residency Kenmore Limited (AARK). Mortimer said that Aitkin's blog belittled him, discredited his aboriginality intentionally and cast doubt on his community standing. Aitkin refused to retract his statement, saying "there is nothing offensive in saying that Shane Mortimer doesn't look Aboriginal because looking Aboriginal isn't one of the criteria. The criteria are, do you claim to be, and are you accepted by others as one." Aboriginal Northern Territory parliamentarian Bess Price said Mortimer was "silly" to be offended by Aitkin's comments.

Mortimer refused to take part in an ACT Government Aboriginal genealogy project in 2011–12, saying the project was divisive and racist.
