= Richard Walley =

Indigenous Australian performer

Richard Barry Walley OAM (born 1953) is a Nyungar man and an Aboriginal Australian performer, musician and writer, who has been a campaigner for the Indigenous cause. Walley is also a visual artist.

== Life and career ==
Walley, born in 1953 in Meekatharra, 750 kilometres (470 mi) north of Perth, Western Australia, spent much of his childhood at Pinjarra, 80 kilometres (50 mi) south of Perth. He began his work in social justice for Indigenous Australians in the Perth region, Nyungar country, at a young age.

He is known for helping to develop the modern Australian welcome to country ritual, when in 1976 he and Ernie Dingo created a ceremony to welcome a group of Māori artists who were participating in the Perth International Arts Festival.

In 1978, he founded the Middar Aboriginal Theatre with three friends, including Ernie Dingo, who he had met playing basketball. Walley had realised early the powerful potential of theatre to raise issues and bring messages to the broader community, black and white. Aiming to take the Nyungar culture from the south-west corner of Australia to as many people as possible, the Middar group went on to perform in 32 countries, on every continent, to live audiences totalling almost ten million people.

After acting in theatre and TV, Walley went on to further develop his theatre skills, holding the role of either director or assistant director in 10 productions in theatre and TV from 1982 to 1993. Several of these productions took place in the United States and the UK. In March 1990, the Aboriginal National Theatre Trust staged the world premiere of his play Munjong, directed by Vivian Walker (son of Oodgeroo Noonuccal), at the Victorian Arts Centre.

In 1993, Walley was awarded the Order of Australia Medal for his contribution to the performing arts and Nyungar culture.

Walley is also a renowned didgeridoo player and has produced a six CD collection of didgeridoo music that is inspired by the six seasons of the Nyungar calendar. He has played didgeridoo live at London's Royal Albert Hall, as well as in Greece, Slovenia, Japan, Mexico, the US and Canada.

From 2000, he served as Chair of the Australia Council's Aboriginal and Torres Strait Islander Arts Board, a position he had held previously between 1992 and 1996.

In 2001, Murdoch University in Western Australia recognised his contribution to Nyungar culture and the wider community with an honorary Doctorate of Letters.

In 2001, he performed in Westminster Abbey for dignitaries, including Queen Elizabeth II, as part Australia's Centenary of Federation celebrations.

Walley has been involved as director, designer, writer, musician, dancer and actor with a range of stage and television productions, including The Dreamers (1982), A Fortunate Life (1984), Bullies House (1985), Coordah (1985), Australian Mosaic (1988), Jackaroo (1990), Balaan Balaan Gwdtha (1992) and Close to the Bone (1993).

Walley is a fluent speaker of the Nyungar language, and an accomplished visual artist.

In 2013, Walley designed a football jumper for the Fremantle Football Club to wear during the Australian Football League's Indigenous Round. In 2016 he was appointed as the club's honorary number 1 ticketholder.

The Perth Symphony Orchestra paid tribute to Walley in performances on 5–6 September 2025 as part of its WA Stories series which honours icons who helped shape the state.

== Discography ==
=== Albums ===
| Title | Details |
|---|---|
| Bilya | Released: 1990; Label: Sunset Music Australia; Format: CD |
| Kooyar | Released: 1995; Label: Sunset Music Australia (SMACD09); Format: CD |
| Yoowintj | Released: 1995; Label: Sunset Music Australia (SMACD11); Format: CD |
| Waitch | Released: 1995; Label: Sunset Music Australia (SMACA13); Format: CD |
| Carda | Released: 1996; Label: Sunset Music Australia (SMAD16); Format: CD |
| Boolong | Released: 1996; Label: Sunset Music Australia; Format: CD |
| Two Tribes | Released: 2003; Label: SunMusic (SMACD35); Format: CD |
| Two Roads | Released: 2005; Label: Abilya Records (Abilya 01); Format: CD |

== Awards ==
=== West Australian Music Industry Awards ===
The West Australian Music Industry Awards (WAMIs) are annual awards presented to the local contemporary music industry, put on annually by the Western Australian Music Industry Association Inc (WAM). Richard Walley has won one award.

| Year | Nominee / work | Award | Result (wins only) |
|---|---|---|---|
| 2006 | Richard Walley | Best Indigenous Act | Won |
