= Ngambri =

Australian Aboriginal group of the Canberra region

Ngambri people
Regions with significant populations
- Australia: over 400

Languages
- Walgalu

Related ethnic groups
- Other Aboriginal Australians

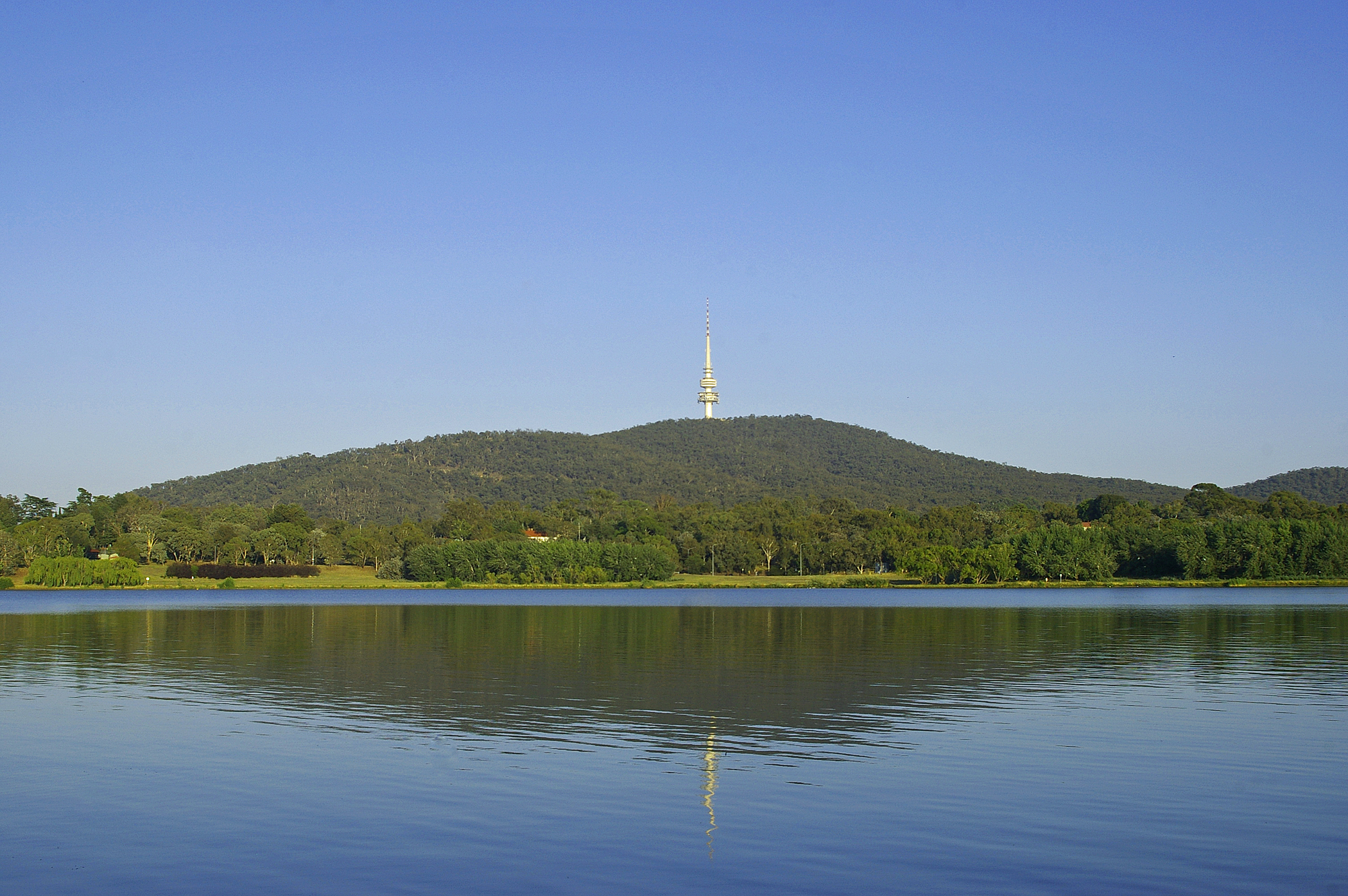
Black Mountain, part of the claimed territory of the Ngambri

The Ngambri, also known as Kamberri, are an Aboriginal clan or group who claim traditional ownership of the Australian Capital Territory area, but their connection to the land is contested. One reason for this is that Canberra, where Ngambri claims are made, lay close to the tribal boundaries that separated the Ngarigo from the Ngunnawal people (according to Norman Tindale). Other reasons are the dislocation of Aboriginal populations and intertribal marriage and interracial relationships following European settlement, leading to a high proportion of people identifying themselves as Indigenous Australians, but not knowing their traditional origins.

The Ngambri people are represented by a local Aboriginal Land Council, the Ngambri Local Aboriginal Land Council, based in Queanbeyan.

== Traditional owners dispute ==
In 1974 Norman Tindale, in his major work on Aboriginal tribal boundaries, located the southern boundary of Ngunnawal country close to the ACT boundary, close to the tribal boundaries that separated the Ngarigo from the Ngunnawal people, who were from Yass.

The extent of recognised Ngambri (also known as Kamberri) territory, and of their distinction from other Aboriginal clans or peoples, is contested.

In 2002, a group of Ngambri people burnt down a humpy and dismantled tents at the Aboriginal Tent Embassy. At the time, prominent Ngambri elder Matilda House said her people were "cleaning up the site and making it respectable so that when visitors do come here we will be proud". House had been closely involved with the tent embassy since it was founded in 1972 and remembers the four men who founded the embassy as heroes. House had a vision for the future of the tent embassy:

I'd like to see the tent embassy used for a place of education and proper understanding of protocols and the proper understanding of our identity. It could be achieved by looking at a proper way of having a place where Aboriginal people can do what they want and protest. But in a manner that will get the message across and (provide) a really good place for educating the rest of the community. Not this thing where buses will pull up and sometimes people get told the wrong story.

The comprehensive dislocation of Aboriginal populations, intertribal marriage and interracial relationships following European settlement has led to a high proportion of people identifying themselves as Indigenous Australians, but not knowing their traditional origins. In 2012, Australian Bureau of Statistics records showed several Aboriginal families in the ACT were affected by the removal of mixed-race children from their parents in the Stolen Generation era. Due to the geographical relocation of Indigenous populations, along with intertribal marriages since the 1900s, there are disputes between people who claim descent from the Ngambri family of the Nyanmudy/Namadgi, Ngarigo and Ngunnawal people, who all claim they are Canberra's traditional owners.

In 2005, in response to a question in the ACT Legislative Assembly about the status of the Ngambri people, the Chief Minister at the time, Jon Stanhope stated that "Ngambri is the name of one of a number of family groups that make up the Ngunnawal nation". He went on to say that "the Government recognises members of the Ngunnawal nation as descendants of the original inhabitants of this region: there is no specific recognition of the Ngambri group outside of this broader acknowledgement".

The debate came to a head in April 2009 when five "Welcome to Canberra" signs on the Canberra border were defaced by replacing the words "Ngunnawal Country" with "Ngambri Country". The signs were quickly restored by the ACT Government, with the Chief Minister Jon Stanhope promising that the signs would be monitored closely in the future. He said that one family who had formerly identified as Ngunnawal later identified as Ngambri, causing "confusion and distress within the community".

In December 2012, the Ngambri Local Aboriginal Land Council made three applications for native title:

- McQuoid Street, Queanbeyan, NSW
- Karabar, Queanbeyan, NSW
- Erin Street, Queanbeyan, NSW

For each application, the court determined that native title did not exist.

In 2013, an ACT Government genealogy report entitled Our Kin Our Country was released. The report, researched to settle the dispute of who were the first people, found that the Ngunnawal were not the original inhabitants of the ACT; however they did attend corroborees in the area. The report concluded that evidence gathered from the mid-1800s onward was too scant to exclusively support any present day group's claims. It showed that the ACT land had been either part of the Ngarigo tribe territory, the Nyamudy territory, or split between the Nyamudy and Namadgi people.

The ACT Government has recognised only the Ngunnawal people as traditional owners of the land since around 2003. In July 2022, the Ngambri took the ACT government to the Supreme Court for recognition of their status as traditional owners but other groups do give acknowledgement, including the National Museum of Australia.

In April 2023, the ACT Government apologised to the Ngambri people for not recognising them as traditional owners, said that it would be reviewing its Indigenous protocols, and reached a settlement with them. Ngunnawal people called this an "affront" to their people, with spokesman Richie Allan saying that their connection had been proven, and while many peoples have some connection to the land, "they don't belong to this land, [only] Ngunnawal people do". The ACT Government said that it "would continue to acknowledge the Ngunnawal people as traditional custodians of the ACT while also recognising any other people or families with connection to the ACT and region".

== Ngambri Local Aboriginal Land Council ==
The Ngambri Local Aboriginal Land Council is based in Queanbeyan.

== Traditional diet ==
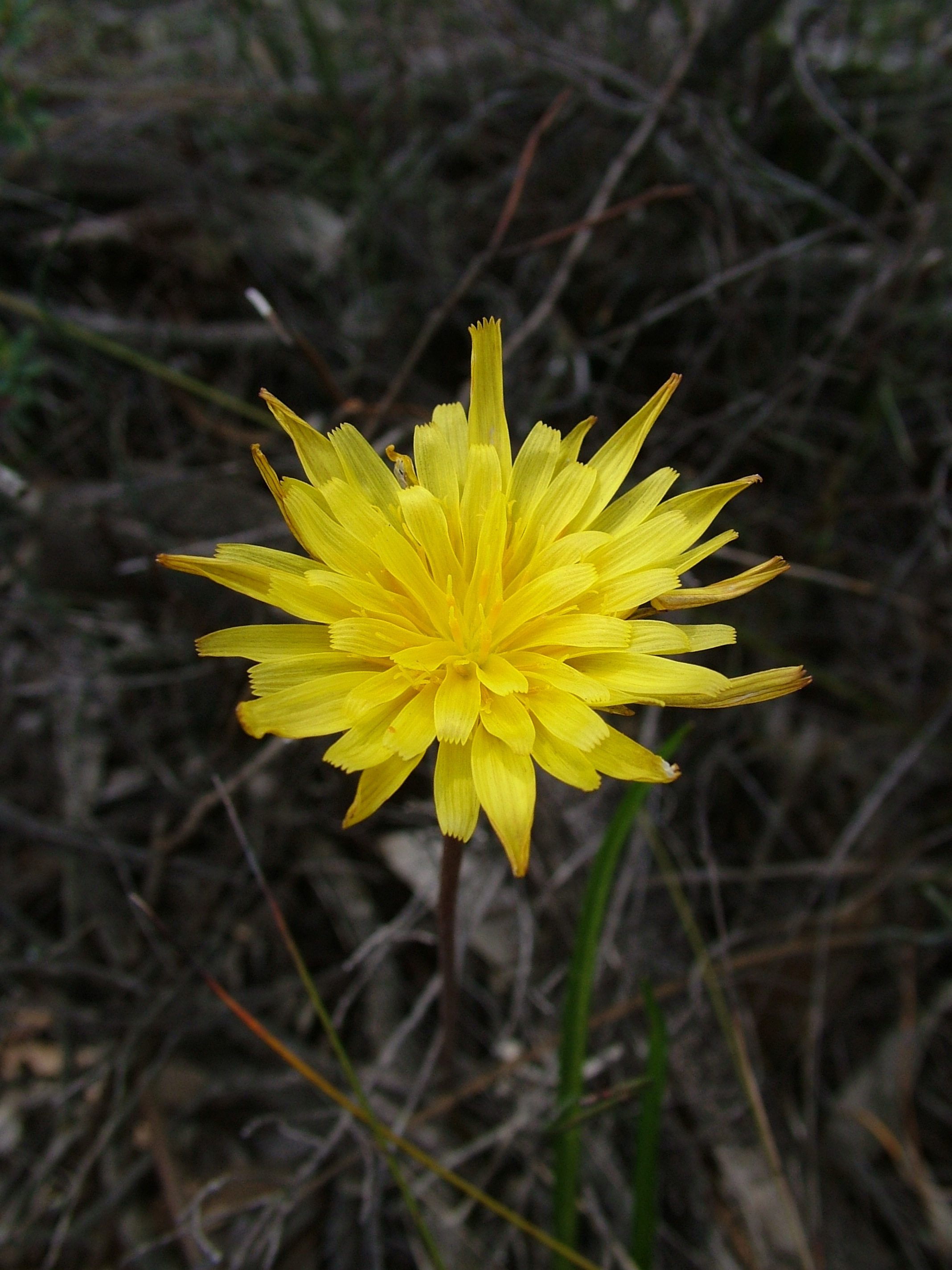
Murnong, a staple in the traditional diet of Ngambri people

Murnong, now rare in the ACT due to land development, were a staple in the diet of traditional Ngambri people. They also ate grass trees, bulrushes, native raspberries, apple berries and native cherries.

For protein, the witchetty grub, bogong moth, emu, koala, cod, platypus, echidna, brolga and bush turkey were all represented in the traditional Ngambri people's diet.

== Notable people ==
- "Onyong" (full name Allianoyonyiga), leader of the Ngambri at the time of colonisation
- Matilda House, prominent elder and activist, recipient of the Female Elder of the Year award at the 2023 national NAIDOC ball
- Papunya Connors, Ngambri leader and recipient of ACT NAIDOC Person of the Year award, 2023

== Sources ==
- "Aboriginals and Torres Strait Islanders-Ngambri group". Parliamentary Debates (Hansard). Australian Capital Territory Legislative Assembly. 6 May 2005. p. 2028.
- "ACT Government Genealogy Project: Our Kin Our Country" (PDF). ACT Government Community Services. August 2012. Archived from the original (PDF) on 17 March 2013.
- "ACT signs fixed after land rights stoush". ABC News. 11 April 2009. Archived from the original on 3 April 2013.
- "ACT split: Claims fly" (PDF). Koori Mail. 12 August 2009. p. 4.
- "The Bogong Moth Story". ACT Territory and Municipal Services. 18 December 2012.
- Bolt, Andrew (13 April 2009). "Canberra gets new owners". The Herald Sun. Archived from the original on 17 April 2009.
- "Dining with the Ngambri". Archived from the original on 22 June 2005.
- "Govt to quell dispute". The Post-Courier. 7 August 2009. Archived from the original on 3 April 2013.
- "Importance of Plants to Aboriginal People". ACT Territory and Municipal Services. 8 February 2013. Archived from the original on 9 March 2014.
- Inman, Michael (11 April 2009). "Uproar at Aboriginal sign being renamed". The Canberra Times.
- "Inside: Life in Children's Homes and Institutions: exhibition launch". National Museum of Australia. 15 November 2011. Archived from the original on 25 May 2012.
- Ja, Crystal (6 August 2009). "Indigenous groups fight over ownership". The Sydney Morning Herald. Archived from the original on 23 September 2009.
- Karvelas, Patricia (8 February 2008). "Rudd into a second tribal welcome". The Australian.
- Kelly, Joe (28 January 2012). "Hard work of 70s indigenous heroes 'destroyed'". The Australian. Archived from the original on 28 January 2012.
- Metherell, Mark (31 October 2002). "Aboriginal group wrecks embassy". The Sydney Morning Herald. Archived from the original on 21 March 2009.
- Mortimer, Shane (20 May 2010). "Appendix 9: Quote from Mr Shane Mortimer, of the Ngambri People" (PDF). Report of the Grassland Forum. Office of the Commissioner for Sustainability and the Environment. Archived from the original (PDF) on 10 May 2013.
- Ngambri Local Aboriginal Land Council v Attorney-General of New South Wales [2012] FCA 1484 (19 December 2012), Federal Court (Australia).
- "Ngambri Statement". Ngambri. Archived from the original on 26 September 2012.
- "NSW – Native title determination summary – Ngambri Local Aboriginal Land Council #1". National Native Title Tribunal. 2012a. Archived from the original on 14 April 2013.
- "NSW – Native title determination summary – Ngambri Local Aboriginal Land Council #2". National Native Title Tribunal. 2012b.
- "NSW – Native title determination summary – Ngambri Local Aboriginal Land Council #3". National Native Title Tribunal. 2012c.
- Polimeni, Melissa (22 May 2009). "Stateline: Indigenous Times". ABC.
- "Report of the Grassland Forum" (PDF). Office of the Commissioner for Sustainability and the Environment. 20 May 2010. Archived from the original (PDF) on 10 May 2013.
- Schubert, Misha (1 February 2008). "Elders hit out over bungled protocol". The Age. Archived from the original on 5 November 2012.
- Sydney, 702 ABC (6 August 2009). "ACT formally recognises Ngunnawal people". ABC.
- Towell, Noel (9 April 2013). "Canberra's first people still a matter for debate". The Canberra Times. Archived from the original on 10 April 2013.
