= Ngunnawal =

Aboriginal Australian group of southern NSW and the ACT

The Ngunnawal people, also spelt Ngunawal, are an Aboriginal people of southern New South Wales and the Australian Capital Territory in Australia.

== Language ==
Ngunnawal and Gundungurra are Australian Aboriginal languages from the Pama-Nyungan family, the traditional languages of the Ngunnawal and Gandangara peoples respectively. The two varieties are very closely related, being considered dialects of the one (unnamed) language, in the technical, linguistic sense of those terms. One classification of these varieties groups them with Ngarigo, as one of several Southern Tableland languages of New South Wales.

== Country ==
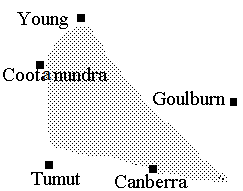
Traditional lands of the Ngunnawal peoples of New South Wales (Note: This map is indicative only.)

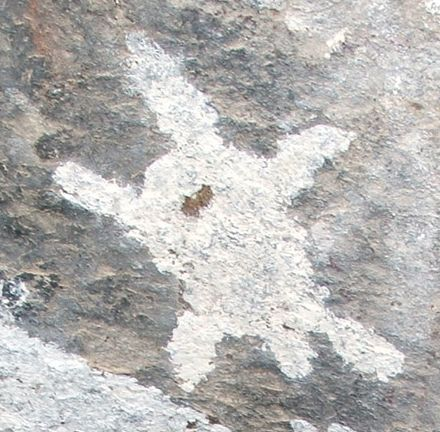
Art at Yankee Hat, possibly an echidna

When first encountered by European colonisers in the 1820s, the Ngunawal-speaking Indigenous people lived around this area.

Their tribal country, according to the early ethnographer R. H. Mathews, extended from Goulburn to Yass and Boorowa southwards as far as Lake George to the east and Goodradigbee to the west. To the south of Lake George was the county of the Nyamudy speaking a Ngarigo dialect. Recent research by Harold Koch (2011) and others shows that the Ngunnawal country was primarily the land surrounding the Yass River extending between Lake George to the east and the Murrumbidgee to the west, while the southern boundary of the Ngunnawal people was north of Canberra, approximately on a line from Gundaroo to Wee Jasper. Sometimes the whole of the Burragorang language speaking area as far north as near Young is included as Ngunnawal, giving them a population in the 1830s of well over a thousand people.

A major battle for ownership of the country was fought at Sutton between an invading Ngunnawal band and the Nyamudy inhabitants, which the former won, establishing the Ngunnawal country, which did not extend further south along the Yass River than Gundaroo.

== People ==
The Ngunawal people were northern neighbours of the Nyamudy/Namadgi people who lived to the south on the Limestone Plains. The Wiradjuri (to the west) and Gundungurra (to the north) peoples also bordered the Ngunnawal.

== Dispute over traditional ownership ==
At present, three groups contest ownership in the Canberra area: the Ngambri, the Ngarigo, and the Walgalu speaking Ngambri-Guumaal, represented by Shane Mortimer, with widespread connections from across the Snowy Mountains up to the Blue Mountains.

According to settlers living in the area in the 1830s, such as quoted in the Queanbeyan Age, there were three groups in the region: the Ngunnawal, the Nyamudy/Namadgi and the Ngarigo.

The present dispute originated when the Chief Minister of the Australian Capital Territory at the time, Jon Stanhope, inaccurately stated that "Ngambri is the name of one of a number of family groups that make up the Ngunnawal nation." He went on to say that "the Government recognises members of the Ngunnawal nation as descendants of the original inhabitants of this region." He made the error after talking with multiracial people of part Ngunnawal descent, whose forebears had come from Yass in the 1920s to find work.

In 2012 research for the ACT Government, "Our Kin, Our Country", found "there is no basis within the description of the country supplied by Tindale. The research confirmed that the language spoken in the Canberra region was a dialect of Ngarigu, "related to but distinguishable from the dialects spoken at Tumut and Monaro'". The report stated that evidence gathered historically was too scant to support any family's claims to be original owners.

Some Canberra-area Aboriginal people in inland southeast Australia, including Matilda House, identify as Ngambri. Shane Mortimer defines himself as one of the Ngambri-Guumwaal, Guumwaal being a language name said to mean "high country". This claim to be a distinct nation is disputed by many other local Aboriginal people who say that the Ngambri are a small family who took their name from the Sullivan's Creek area located to the east of Black Mountain in the late 1990s.

== Native title ==
The earliest direct evidence of Aboriginal occupation in the area comes from a rock shelter near the area of Birrigai near Tharwa, which has been dated to approximately 25,000 years ago. However, it is likely (based on older sites known from the surrounding regions) that human occupation of the region goes back considerably further.

Ngunnawal people were gradually displaced from the Yass area beginning in the 1820s when graziers began to occupy the land there. Some people worked at properties in the region. In 1826 many Aboriginal people at Lake George protested an incident involving a shepherd and an Aboriginal woman, though the protesters moved away peacefully.

Historical records of Australia record the last "full-blooded" Ngunnawal person, Nellie Hamilton, dying in 1897, however, this is disputed by Indigenous and non-Indigenous Australians, as there are many Ngunnawal people still around today.

== Notes ==
Legal status of native title not current.

== Sources ==
- Dixon, R. M. W. (2002). Australian Languages: Their Nature and Development. Cambridge University Press. ISBN 978-0-521-47378-1.
- "The Future of the Tent Embassy". ABC Australia. 25 November 2005. Archived from the original on 13 May 2008.
- Koch, Harold (2010). "Aboriginal languages and social groups in the Canberra region: interpreting the historical documentation". Indigenous Language and Social Identity: papers in honour of Michael Walsh. Pacific Linguistics.
- Kwok, Natalie (January 2013). Considering traditional Aboriginal affiliations in the ACT region: Draft Report (PDF). ACT government.
- Mathews, R. H. (1904). "The Wiradyuri and Other Languages of New South Wales". The Journal of the Anthropological Institute of Great Britain and Ireland. 34 (July–December): 284–305. doi:10.2307/2843103. JSTOR 2843103.
- McKeon, Rosemarie (20 October 1995). "SCULPTURE FORUM 95: ABORIGINAL ART at the Canberra Contemporary Art Space". Archived from the original on 6 September 2004.
- Osborne, Tegan (28 April 2016). "What is the Aboriginal history of Canberra?". ABC News.
- "Our Kin Our Country" (PDF). ACT Government Genealogy Project. August 2012.
- Tindale, Norman Barnett (1974). "Ngunawal (NSW)". Aboriginal Tribes of Australia: Their Terrain, Environmental Controls, Distribution, Limits, and Proper Names. Australian National University. ISBN 978-0-708-10741-6.
- Towell, Noel (9 April 2013). "Canberra's first people still a matter for debate". The Canberra Times. Archived from the original on 10 April 2013.
