= Lettsom raid =

1840 military raid and mass-arrest of Indigenous Australians near Melbourne

The Lettsom raid was the mass-arrest and imprisonment of approximately 400 Wurundjeri, Woiworrung, Boonwurrung and Taungurung people (collectively known as the Kulin nation of Indigenous Australians) occurring in October 1840 near the British settlement of Melbourne. It was conducted by soldiers and troopers led by Major Samuel Lettsom of the New South Wales Mounted Police, under the authority of both the Superintendent of the Port Phillip District, Charles La Trobe, and the Governor of New South Wales, George Gipps.

The raid was conducted as part of a larger operation aiming to remove Aboriginal people from the town of Melbourne, and also to capture or eradicate the Indigenous leaders of a resistance movement against British colonisation.

As a result of the raid, a leading Indigenous insurgent named Winberri was shot dead and nine others sentenced to transportation. It also led to the local Indigenous clans being forced to reside away from Melbourne to designated reserves at Nerre Nerre Warren, and later at the Merri Creek reserve.

== Background ==
British colonists began their occupation of Kulin country in 1835 with the arrival of John Batman and the establishment of the town of Melbourne; within several years almost 12,000 Europeans had appropriated most of the Kulin land and dispossessed the owners.

Melbourne was not only a traditional place of meeting but also became a place where food, water and stimulants could be obtained from the Europeans, their usual sources being increasingly denied to them as the colonists usurped their land elsewhere. They were often found walking around Melbourne and set up a community at the Yarra camp on the south bank opposite the settlement.

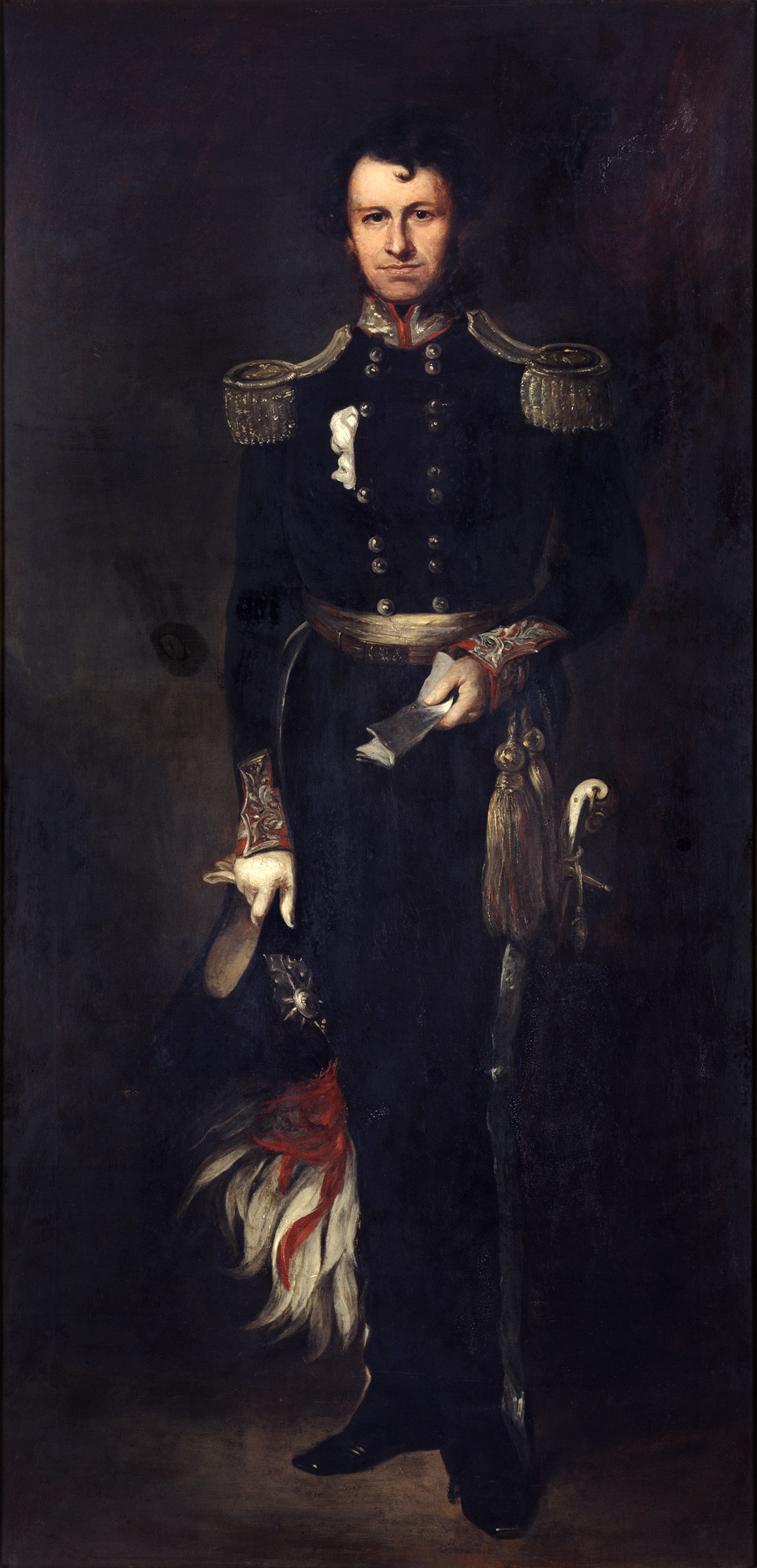
Charles La Trobe

By late 1839, as the European population increased, the Superintendent of the Port Phillip District, Charles La Trobe, directed that Aboriginal people were to be moved from Melbourne signalling their presence would no longer be tolerated.

La Trobe summoned the Aboriginal Protectors, George Augustus Robinson and William Thomas, and told them that if they could not succeed in breaking up the Yarra camp, he would send Captain Frederick Russell of the NSW Mounted Police to do the job. In May 1840, Thomas managed to move around 122 people from the camp to Western Port. However, around 200 either remained or returned to the Yarra camp, calling Thomas a spy and blaming him for the authorities wanting them removed from Melbourne. La Trobe tried to entice their expulsion from the town by offering rations and a reserve of land at Nerre Nerre Warren.

However, by the middle of 1840, La Trobe was increasingly willing to use force to remove the Aboriginal people from Melbourne. In September, he issued orders to expel them directing that "no Aboriginal blacks...are to visit the township of Melbourne under any pretext whatever".

Additionally during the same period, armed groups of Taungurung men were conducting a campaign of resistance to the north-east of Melbourne. Led by warriors such as Winberri, these gangs raided cattle and sheep stations around the Yea River, Broken River and the Ovens River, killing shepherds, taking sheep and acquiring guns and ammunition. La Trobe was alarmed at this insurgency and ordered the confiscation of guns from Aborigines and directed the Mounted Police to patrol the outskirts of Melbourne to prevent any "blacks" from entering the town.

In Sydney, the Governor of New South Wales, George Gipps despatched Major Samuel Lettsom of the 80th Regiment to Melbourne with a contingent of Mounted Police troopers to enforce order.

Major Lettsom had a list of Aborigines wanted by the authorities as "objectionable characters" which included Winberri. Lettsom said that if he could not get those on the list he would take others as hostages.

In a preliminary action on 1 October 1840, Lettsom and his Mounted Police made a raid on the Kulin Yarra camp, charging their horses and driving men, women and children into the river and up into the trees to avoid injury.

== The Lettsom raid and the killing of Winberri ==
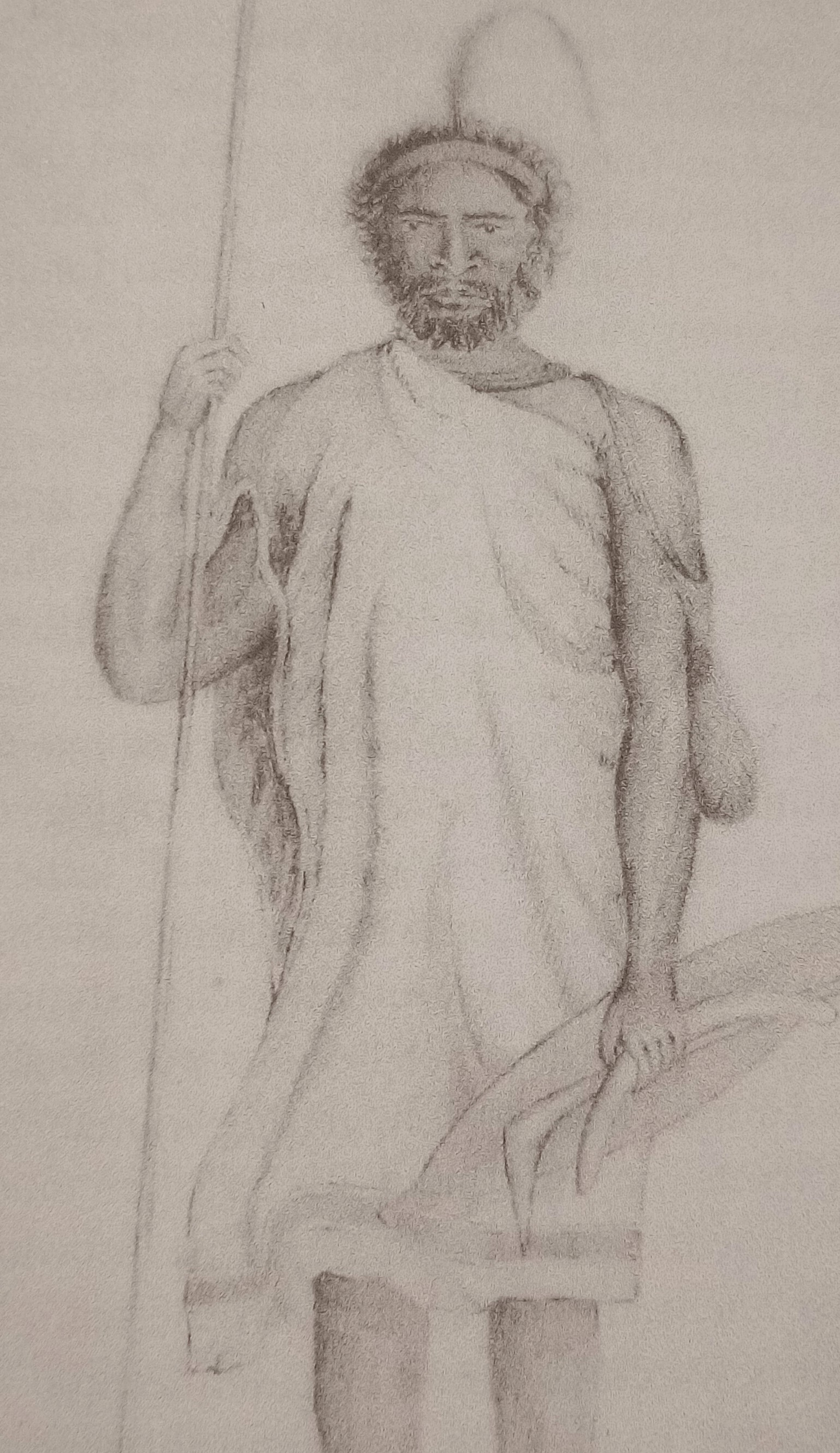
The resistance leader Winberri who was killed during the Lettsom raid

Not long after dispersing the Yarra camp, Lettsom received news that a large group of Taungurung people were coming down from the Goulburn River region to conduct a corroborree with the Wurundjeri people of the Melbourne region. Together, they were to organise a ritual battle against the Wathaurong as well as to discuss La Trobe's ordered expulsion of Aboriginal people from Melbourne. Lettsom was presented with an opportunity to "instil a little salutary dread" into "the blacks", as Winberri was said to be amongst the travellers.

On Friday 9 October 1840, the large meeting of around 400 Kulin men, women and children began at what is now Yarra Bend Park. In the early hours of Sunday 11 October, Major Lettsom with soldiers of the 28th Regiment under Captain George Brunswick Smyth, troopers of the NSW Mounted Police under Lieutenant Russell and Border Police troopers under Frederick Powlett, stealthily surrounded the large group while they slept. The soldiers and troopers then surprised the gathering and arrested and chained almost the entire group, with only a few escaping. Several people were wounded during the arrest in what was to become known as the Lettsom Raid.

Winberri was soon identified and as he was being chained he broke loose and attempted to attack Lieutenant Francis Vignolles of the 28th Regiment with his waddy. Sergeant Leary of the Mounted Police shot Winberri dead before he could land a blow on the lieutenant.

== Mass imprisonment of men, women and children ==
After killing Winberri and securing the remaining 300 to 400 Aboriginal people, Lettsom and his troopers marched them down Heidelberg Road and into Melbourne. Large numbers of their pet dogs and dingoes were shot before they left. The women, children and old men who lagged behind were forced to keep moving by being pricked with bayonets and clubbed with rifle butts. Numerous injuries were recorded.

At around 7am on the same morning, the hundreds of Taungurung, Woiwurrung, Boonwurrung and Wurundjeri captives were herded down Collins Street and corralled into a yard adjoining the hospital, opposite the main barracks. Rolf Boldrewood described the scene as

a whole tribe of blacks — wondering and frightened, young and old, warriors and greybeards, women and children — is being driven along Collins Street by troopers, on their way to the temporary gaol, there to be incarcerated for real or fancied violence.

At 1pm those identified as Wurundjeri, Woiwurrung or Boonwurrung were allowed to leave. Around 35 Taungurung men and boys remained imprisoned, chained together and incarcerated in a warehouse next to the barracks. That night some of the Taungurung attempted to escape from the warehouse. The soldiers guarding the warehouse discovered the attempt and shot dead a man and wounded another. Several others managed to escape.

== Sentencing and shooting of resistance leaders ==
Of the 35 Taungurung chained up in jail, ten were remanded in custody to face trial for the "outrages" against the British colonists in the Goulburn River region. Turrukmunnin, Nandermiel, Logermakoon, Piengingoon, Kowinyowlett, Waverong and four others which probably including Jackie Jackie faced court in early January 1841, where nine of them were found guilty and sentenced to 10 years transportation to Cockatoo Island jail in Sydney Harbour.

On 14 January 1841, the nine convicted men were loaded onto a small vessel on the Yarra River to be taken to a ship in Port Phillip Bay and transported to Sydney. While travelling down the river, the nine Taungurung men chained in irons, jumped overboard and attempted to swim to liberty. Four were shot dead, the others escaping with various wounds. Turrukmunnin, who was 17 years old, was wounded and recaptured. He was later released.

== Aftermath ==
After the Lettsom raid and the associated "display of terror", the Kulin people were compelled to live at the designated reserves at Nerre Nerre Warren and Merri Creek away from Melbourne. However, for several years they continued to exercise their mobility and did not cease to visit Melbourne, despite the real possibility of further military intervention. Six years after the raid, La Trobe still found himself ordering Kulin camps to be burnt to force them out from the settlement.

Resistance by the Taungurung people to colonisation north-east of Melbourne also continued for another year or so after the Lettsom raid, with them seeking revenge on local colonists for those killed.

== Sources ==
- Barwick, Diane E. (1984). McBryde, Isabel (ed.). "Mapping the past: an atlas of Victorian clans 1835–1904". Aboriginal History. 8 (2): 100–131. JSTOR 24045800.
- Boldrewood, Rolf (1896). Old Melbourne Memories. London: MacMillan.
- Boyce, James (2011). 1835: The founding of Melbourne and the conquest of Australia. Collingwood: Black Inc. ISBN 978-1-760-64480-2.
- Broome, Richard (2005). Aboriginal Victorians: A History Since 1800. Allen & Unwin. ISBN 978-1-741-14569-4.
- Cannon, Michael (1993). Black Land, White Land. Port Melbourne: Minerva. ISBN 978-1-863-30315-6.
- Clark, Ian D.; Heydon, Toby (2004). A Bend in the Yarra: A history of the Merri Creek Protectorate Station and Merri Creek Aboriginal School. Canberra: Aboriginal Studies Press. ISBN 0-85575-469-9.
- Fels, Marie (2011). 'I Succeeded Once': The Aboriginal Protectorate on the Mornington Peninsula, 1839–1840 (PDF). ANU Press. ISBN 978-1-921-86212-0.
- Standfield, Rachel (2011). "'The vacillating manners and sentiments of these people': Mobility, civilisation and dispossession in the work of William Thomas with the Port Phillip Aboriginal Protectorate". Law Text Culture. 15 (1): 162–184. doi:10.14453/ltc.642.
