= Winberri =

Indigenous Australian resistance leader

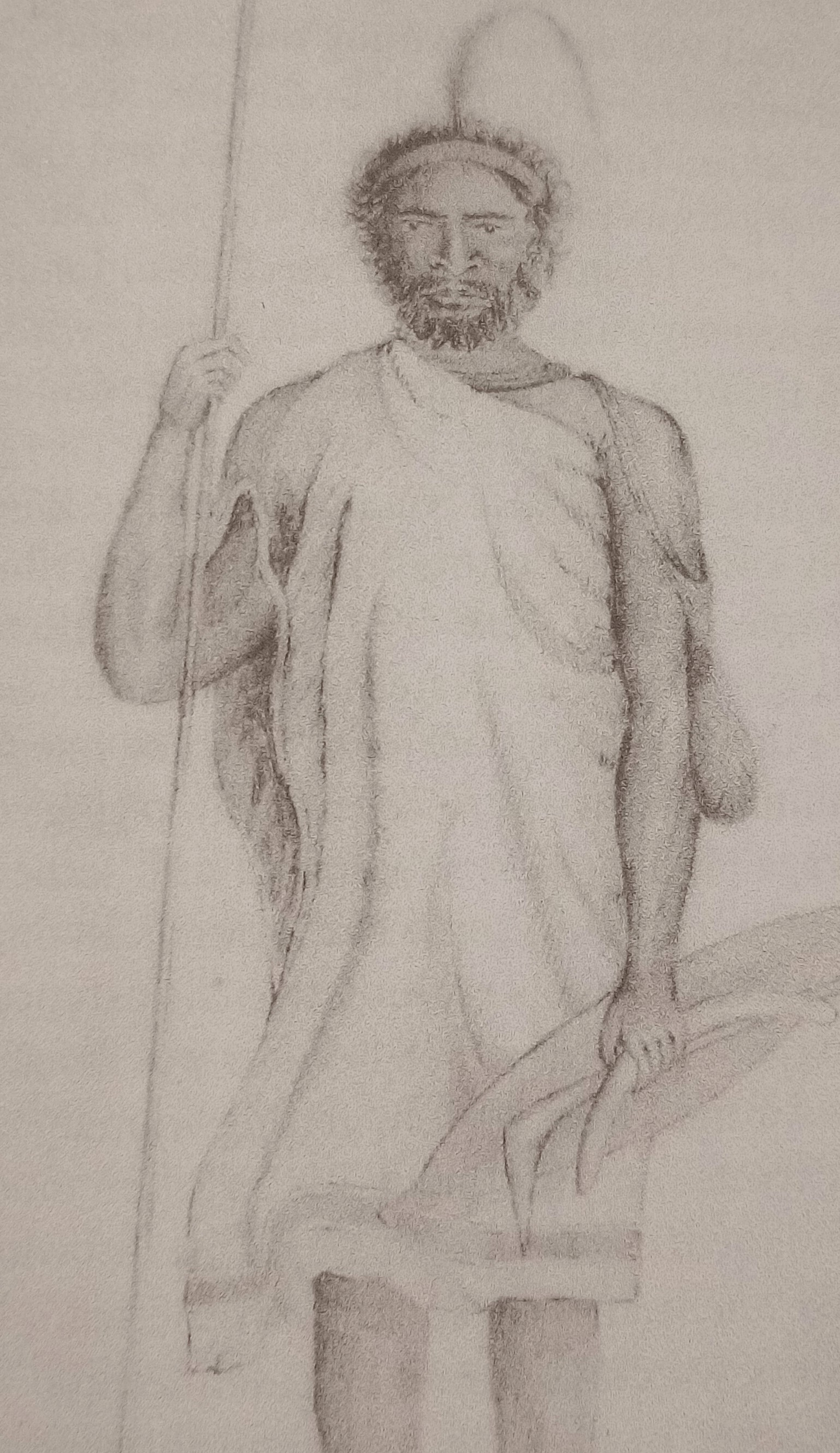
Winberri

Winberri (c. 1820 – 11 October 1840) was an Indigenous Australian resistance leader who, in 1840, led an armed group of Taungurung men in a campaign against British colonists in what is now called central Victoria. Also known as Winberry, Tinbury, or Windberry, he was shot dead in October 1840 by the New South Wales Mounted Police while they were arresting him during the Lettsom raid.

== Early life ==
Winberri was born around the year 1820 into the Warringilum clan of the Taungurung people from the Goulburn River region in what is now Victoria (Warring meaning Goulburn River and ilum meaning clan).

His father was Bittime, who was also called Burregregrowel.

== Campaign of armed resistance against the British ==
From 1838, British colonists began to take Taungurung land as pastoral leases to establish sheep stations and cattle stations. Taungurung people resisted this forced acquisition of their land through armed conflict against the British, the most notable example being the 1838 Battle of Broken River where they drove off George Faithfull's encampment at the future site of Benalla, killing seven of his men.

Winberri is first mentioned as being an active part in this resistance in January 1840 where he was part of a gang of Taungurung and Woiworrung men led by man named Jackie Jackie, also known as Worrumwullock. These Aboriginal men had acquired muskets and raided a property along the upper Yarra River. Troopers of the Border Police led by Henry Fyshe Gisborne were sent after the gang, whom they intercepted near Yarra Glen. A gunfight developed which resulted in the troopers retreating.

Later in the same month, Winberri's father, Burregregowel, was wounded after being shot near the Coliban River in a punitive expedition led by Lieutenant Frederick Russell of the NSW Mounted Police and the British colonist Henry Monro.

In March, Jackie Jackie, Winberri and their gang raided Peter Snodgrass' property along the Yea River, holding Snodgrass' stockmen at gunpoint while taking their sheep and flour. Winberri by this stage was the gang's leader and referred to his men as his soldiers. Winberri claimed the colonists' sheep should be as much his property as it was theirs because the sheep ate the same grass that his kangaroos ate, and that this was his country, not whiteman's country.

Winberri's armed gang continued the roam the region, holding up a supply cart, shooting at its driver and threatening shepherds at Murrindindi. In April, they raided John Chisholm's Myrrhee station, killing one of his shepherds and taking four guns and a stash of ammunition.

They then proceeded across to the upper Broken River, where they held up Peter Stuckey's cattle station at what is now Barjarg. A skirmish developed and Jackie Jackie was wounded by gunfire, while a Wiradjuri stockman named Yarri working for Stuckey was also wounded by a spear thrown by one of Winberri's men.

Winberri's gang retreated after this skirmish but soon held up another run in the Delatite River region, threatening to shoot the manager of the property. The gang was also implicated in shooting two shepherds dead and stealing a herd of sheep at David Waugh's run also along the Delatite River in May.

Around the same time, another armed group combining Taungurung and Waywurru men, led by Pallangan-mittang clan Waywurru men named Harlequin (Jaggeroger), Merriman (Minnup) and Mickey, were raiding properties along the upper Ovens River. In May, this group laid a "masterly" organised 2-day siege upon Dr George Mackay's Whorouly station, killing 3 horses and a number of cattle before retreating. They also hacked to death one of Mackay's stockman who was implicated in the rape of a black woman.

== Military response to the resistance ==
A detachment of NSW Mounted Police under Lieutenant Russell was sent to intercept Winberri's gang, but were ambushed by them at a river crossing wounding three troopers with their muskets.

The colonial authorities now viewed this insurgency of the "Goulburn River blacks" (as they called the Taungurung) led by Winberri and others as a serious uprising. In August 1840, the Lieutenant-Governor of the Port Phillip District, Charles La Trobe, directed that guns be taken away from the Aborigines in his jurisdiction and ordered the expulsion of all Aboriginal people from the settlement of Melbourne.

Additionally, the governor of New South Wales, George Gipps, despatched Major Samuel Lettsom of the 80th Regiment from Sydney with a contingent of Mounted Police troopers and soldiers to the disturbed areas. Lettsom was given a list of most wanted men which included Winberri, Jackie Jackie, Harlequin and Merriman.

The Mounted Police managed to capture Harlequin, Merriman and Mickey. Mickey was shot dead by a colonist during his arrest and Harlequin died in the Melbourne jail after he and Merriman were chained to police horses and forced to jog to Melbourne, covering 220 miles in a week. Winberri and his gang remained at large.

== The Lettsom raid and the killing of Winberri ==
By October 1840, Major Lettsom was still unable to capture Winberri's gang. However, word had gotten out that a large group of Taungurung people were coming down from the Goulburn River region to conduct a corroborree with the Wurundjeri people of the Melbourne region. Together, they were to organise a ritual battle against the Wathaurong as well as to discuss La Trobe's ordered expulsion of Aboriginal people from Melbourne. Lettsom was presented with an opportunity to "instil a little salutary dread" into "the blacks", as Winberri and Jackie Jackie were rumoured to be amongst the travellers.

On Friday 9 October 1840, the large meeting of around 400 Taungurung and Wurundjeri men, women and children began at what is now Yarra Bend Park. In the early hours of Sunday 11 October, Major Lettsom with soldiers of the 28th Regiment under Captain George Brunswick Smyth, troopers of the NSW Mounted Police under Lieutenant Russell and Border Police troopers under Frederick Powlett, stealthily surrounded the large group while they slept. After a discrete signal, the soldiers and troopers arrested and chained almost the entire group, with only one man and two women escaping. Several people were wounded during the arrest in what was to become known as the Lettsom raid.

Winberri was soon identified and as he was being chained he broke loose and attempted to attack Lieutenant Francis Vignolles of the 28th Regiment with his waddy. Sergeant Leary of the Mounted Police shot Winberri before he could land a blow on the lieutenant. The bullet pierced through his neck and exited his cheek, severing the carotid artery in the process. Winberri died instantly. He was buried later that day in a makeshift coffin just outside the Old Melbourne Cemetery, with a few of his mourning relatives present. A later inquest deemed the killing as justifiable homicide.

== Aftermath ==
After killing Winberri and securing the remaining 300 to 400 Aboriginal people, Lettsom and his troopers marched them down Heidelberg Road and into Melbourne. Large numbers of their pet dogs and dingoes were shot before they left. The women, children and old men who lagged behind were forced to keep moving by being pricked with bayonets and clubbed with rifle butts. Numerous injuries were recorded.

At around 7am on the same morning, the hundreds of Taungurung, Woiwurrung and Wurundjeri captives were herded down Collins Street and corralled into a yard adjoining the hospital, opposite the main barracks. Rolf Boldrewood described the scene as

a whole tribe of blacks — wondering and frightened, young and old, warriors and greybeards, women and children — is being driven along Collins Street by troopers, on their way to the temporary gaol, there to be incarcerated for real or fancied violence

Around 35 Taungurung men and boys were separated from the rest and chained together and placed in the jail on Collins Street. At 1pm those identified as Wurundjeri or Woiwurrung were set free. The remaining Taungurung, being mostly women, children and old men, were incarcerated in a warehouse next to the barracks. That night some of the Taungurung attempted to escape from the warehouse by digging under the wooden plank walls. The soldiers guarding the warehouse discovered the attempt and shot dead an old man and wounded another. Several managed to escape and eventually the others held in the warehouse were released.

Of the 35 Taungurung chained up in jail, ten were remanded in custody to face trial for the "outrages" against the British colonists in the Goulburn River region. Turrukmunnin, Nandermiel, Logermakoon, Piengingoon, Kowinyowlett, Waverong and four others which probably including Jackie Jackie faced court in early January 1841, where nine of them were found guilty and sentenced to 10 years transportation to Cockatoo Island jail in Sydney Harbour.

On 14 January 1841, the nine convicted men were loaded onto a small vessel on the Yarra River to be taken to a ship in Port Phillip Bay and transported to Sydney. While travelling down the river, the nine Taungurung men chained in irons, jumped overboard and attempted to swim to liberty. Four were shot dead, the others escaping with various wounds. Turrukmunnin, who was 17 years old, was wounded and recaptured. He was later released.

Despite the death of Winberri and the policy of indiscriminate terror against Taungurung and Woiwurrung civilians, resistance to British colonisation in the Goulburn and Ovens river region continued, albeit in a reduced form. In December 1840, a Taungurung man was arrested for setting fire to the haystacks on Dr George Mackay's property. The man was chained to a police horse and forced to jog the 60 miles to Melbourne in a day. He collapsed on arrival and died in hospital not long after.

== See also ==
- List of Indigenous Australian historical figures
