= Ngooraialum =

Indigenous Australian tribal sub-group

The Ngooraialum lands

Ngooraialum were an indigenous Australian tribal subgroup, one of three comprising the Ngurai-illam Wurrung, though Norman Tindale placed them among the Taungurung. They inhabited land along the Goulburn River in central Victoria, north of Mitchellstown, at Murchison, above Toolamba, within 40 miles (64 km) of the Murray-Goldburn junction. The heart of their land was Noorillim, which they called Waaring.

== Language ==
The Ngooraialum spoke a dialect of Taungurung, a Kulinic language of the Pama-Nyungan language family, as did the Taungurong. Their ethnonym Nguraialum denotes the dialect they spoke.

== History ==
The Ngooraialum were first mentioned in 1840, when they visited the Mitchellstown depot in February of that year. At that time, their ngurungaeta was Weeng-her-bil. (Note: Or in a variant spelling Wang-her-bil) They were said to be numerous and in good condition, despite some skin diseases, and the names of 53 were registered in 1845.

They were frequently in conflict with the neighbouring Bangerang. Edward M. Curr, noting that a native from Swan Hill used a word used by the Ngooraialum 200 kilometres (120 mi) to the south-east, but not by the tribe in the intermediate area, developed a whole theory of the migration of all the tribes in Australia.

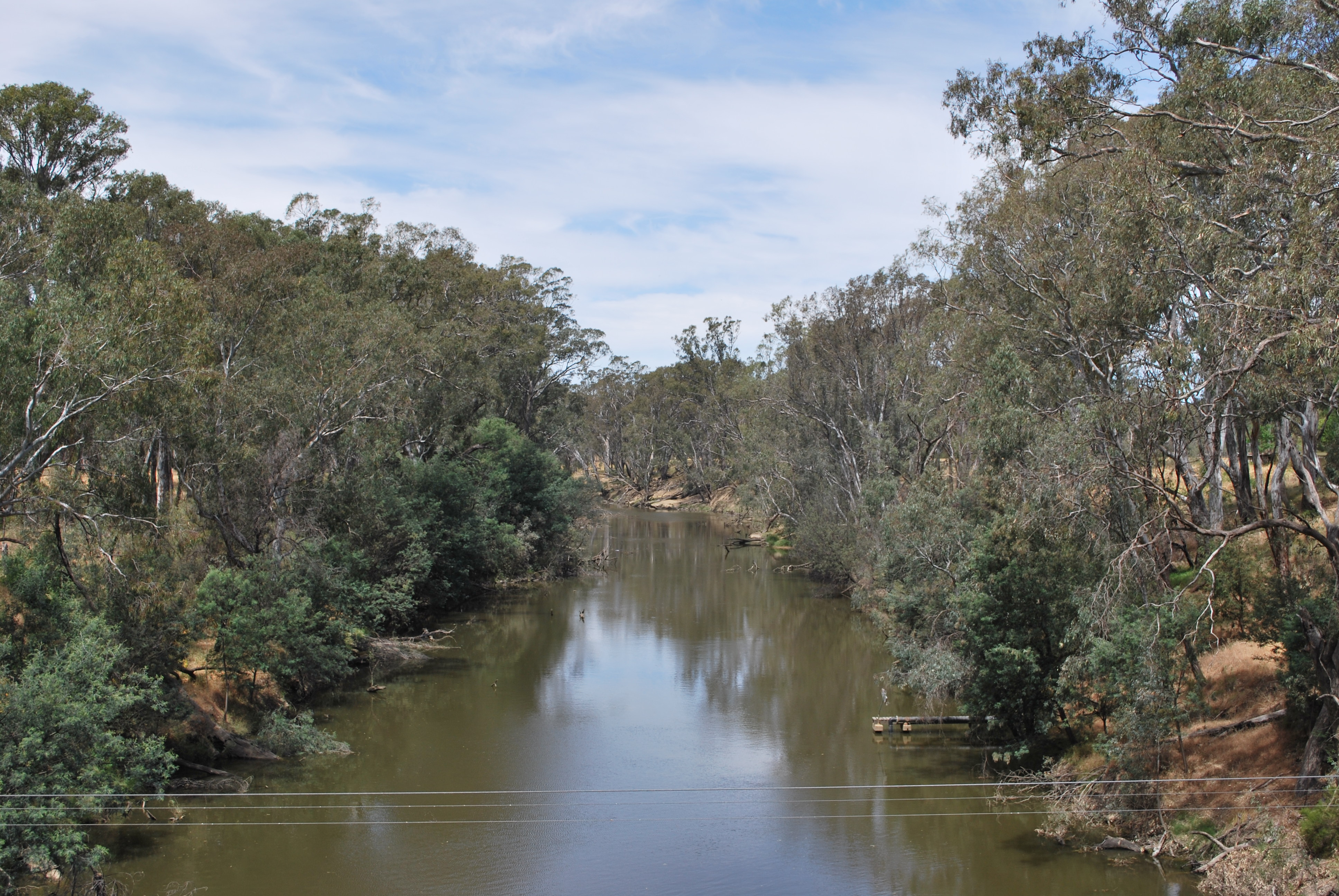
Goulburn River at Murchison

Today, many Ngooraialum in the Goulburn Valley live in the settlement of Rumbalara built in 1958 to replace a shanty town on the edge of Shepparton.

== Alternative names ==
- Ngooralung-boola/Ngouraylung-bulla
- Ngurailum
- Ooraialum
- Oorilim
- Orilims
- Woo-ril-lum/Woo-rai-lim/Wo-ra-lims/Woralim
- Wor-ile-lum-buluc

Source: Barwick 1984, p. 126

== Sources ==
- Barwick, Diane E. (1984). McBryde, Isabel (ed.). "Mapping the past: an atlas of Victorian clans 1835-1904". Aboriginal History. 8 (2): 100–131. JSTOR 24045800.
- Furphy, Samuel (2013). "The Australian Race". Edward M. Curr and the Tide of History. Australian National University Press. pp. 145–156. ISBN 978-0-708-10741-6. JSTOR j.ctt2jbksj.14.
- Smyth, Robert Brough (1878). The Aborigines of Victoria: with notes relating to the habits of the natives of other parts of Australia and Tasmania (PDF). Vol. 1. Melbourne: J. Ferres, gov't printer – via Internet Archive.
- Tindale, Norman Barnett (1974). "Taungurong (VIC)". Aboriginal Tribes of Australia: Their Terrain, Environmental Controls, Distribution, Limits, and Proper Names. Australian National University Press. ISBN 978-0-708-10741-6.
- West, Raymond (1962). Those Were the Days: A Story of Shepparton, Victoria, and to Some Extent, Its District. Waterwheel Press.
