= Taungurung =

Indigenous Australian people of central Victoria

- Location of Taungurung Country in Victoria

Languages
- Taungurung, Australian English

Religion
- Aboriginal mythology, Christianity

Related ethnic groups
- Boonwurrung, Dja Dja Wurrung, Wathaurong, Wurundjeri, Ngurraiillam see List of Indigenous Australian group names

The Taungurung people, also spelled Daungwurrung, are an Indigenous Australian people who are one of the Kulin nations in present-day Victoria, Australia. They consist of nine clans whose traditional language is the Taungurung language.

Their Country is to the north of the Great Dividing Range in the watersheds of the Broken, Delatite, Coliban, Goulburn and Campaspe Rivers. They lived to the north of, and were closely associated with, the Woiwurrung speaking Wurundjeri people.

They were also known by white settlers as the Devil's River Tribe (clans from the Mansfield region) or Goulburn River Tribe (clans from around the Goulburn River region).

== Clan structure ==
The Taungurung have two moieties (kinship groups) covering nine distinct clans, each of which belonged to the Bunjil (Eaglehawk) moiety (five clans) or the Waang (Crow) moiety (four clans).

Bunjil moiety

- Buthera balug (Note: balug is a suffix indicating a number of people (Patterson & Jones 2020, p. 13).), located in the Upper Goulburn area near Yea and Seymour.
- Moomoom Gundidj, around the Campaspe and north-west of Mitchellstown
- Warring-illum (Note: -illam meant a dwelling place) balug around the Upper Goulburn River, Yea and Alexandra.
- Yarran Illam, in the area of the Goulburn river below Seymour.
- Yeerun-Illam around Benalla.

Waang moiety

- Look (w)illam around the Campaspe River near Kilmore
- Nattarak balug is associated with the Coliban and Upper Campaspe Rivers.
- Nira balug adjacent to Wurundjeri country, encompassing hilly terrain near Kilmore, Broadford, Pyalong, Mount Macedon and Heathcote.
- Yowung-Illam balug, associated with Alexandra, Mansfield and the Upper Goulburn River.

== Culture and traditions ==
The Taungurung shared the culture and traditions of the East Kulin Nation regional confederacy which, together with the Taungurung, included the Woiwurrung and Boonwurrung people to the south and the Ngurraiillam people to the north. Other Aboriginal tribes outside of this grouping were considered by them as mainmait or hostile and untrustworthy. The Taungurung were subsequently often in dispute with the non-aligned neighbouring nations of Pangerang (Yorta Yorta), Ovens River and Djadjawurrung people.

The diet of the Taungurung included freshwater mussels, turtles, yabbies, fish, emu, kangaroo, birds and ant's eggs. They made a sweet drink called yeerip korr from the blossoms of the ironbark tree and obtained starch from cultivation of the murnong yam. They manufactured a variety of spears, canoes (corong) and nets to hunt and capture the animal food resources. Wattle bark extract was used as a medicament for various skin diseases.

Young people underwent initiation ceremonies, called jibbogoop, in their later teenage years and the clans practiced son-in-law mother-in-law avoidance customs called ulandibe. Grand gatherings and corroborees between the Taungerong and other tribes occurred in the spring and summer months, often taking place off country at places such as Merri Creek and Tallygaroopna. Trade also existed with neighbouring nations with the Taungurung regularly exchanging their manufactured flints and tomahawks for the light reed spears produced by the Pangerang. The King and Howqua River valleys were amongst the major routes used for trade. The Howqua River valley contains a number of archaeological sites of significance including at least two quarry sites for greenstone, an exceptionally hard rock used for stone axes, spears and other cutting tools which the Taungurung traded with other tribes.

Funereal practices included both internment and cremation. If the person was buried, the limbs of the corpse was firstly tied to body in a crouch position with string made from tree bark. The body was then placed into a grave lying on its left side with the head generally pointing to the east. The gravesite was often marked with a mound formed into a shield shape around which fires were lit at certain times for several months after the burial.

A bunyip type figure named Tooroodun was believed to inhabit certain billabongs and would capture unsuspecting people with its longs legs and hold them until they died.

The Taungurung also played a ball game which they called murnoona.

== History of contact ==
The first Europeans to enter Taungurung country were Hamilton Hume and William Hovell who led an overland expedition in 1824 to Port Phillip. They named the Goulburn River which was known to the Taungurung as Warring. Thomas Mitchell later travelled through the area in 1836. Neither party had significant direct contact with the Taungurung. A later Taungurung leader named Billy Hamilton, also known as Yabbee, described how as a lad he saw Mitchell cross the Goulburn River and in a hurry to remain out of sight, he lost his possum-skin rug.

=== Battle of Broken River ===
Wealthy squatter pastoralists soon followed, bringing flocks of sheep and cattle to take up grazing properties on Taungurung land. William Faithfull and his brother George attempted to establish a sheep station at what is now Benalla on the Broken River. Taungurung actively resisted the Faithfull brothers trying to take their land and killed eight of their workers in what has become known as the Battle of Broken River of April 1838. Several Taungurung were also killed in this skirmish.

Although the Faithfull brothers had to retreat to the Ovens River, they were able, with the help of other colonists including Peter Snodgrass and Colonel Henry White, to conduct a punitive expedition against a group of Taungurung near what is now King Valley, massacring a large number (probably around 50) of men, women and children.

=== Further massacres ===
Other colonists also pushed into Taungurung country from mid-1838. At this time, workers at the newly established property of Captain Sylvester Browne (father of the author Thomas Alexander Browne) near Heathcote shot thirteen Taungurung people dead after some sheep were taken.

Frederick Mundy shot many Taungurung dead after inviting them into his camp. Mundy told authorities that "he had given them such a punishing as they would not readily forget". Frederick Manton at Moorilim sought permission to shoot some resident Aborigines.

Up to forty Taungurung, Ngurraiillam and Djadjawurrung were killed in June 1839 during the Campaspe Plains massacre. The massacre resulted after two employees of Captain Charles Hutton were killed and their sheep taken at the Campaspe Plains. A detachment of New South Wales Mounted Police was summoned and they "fired indiscriminately at any and all Aborigines they saw".

Colonists Charles Ebden, William Henry Yaldwyn and Henry Monroe led more shootings of Aboriginal people along the Coliban River and the Campaspe River in 1839 and 1840.

Around what is modern-day Mansfield, a mass poisoning of the yowung-illam balug clan of the Taungurung was reported in 1839. Bitteruc, a yowung-illam elder at this time, stated that the land surrounding Mansfield was "good country, my country".

=== Armed campaign of resistance ===
Taungurung resistance to British colonisation started with the Battle of Broken River and continued despite the severe retribution of the settlers. Later in 1838, a man named Kangan led a raid on Dr Forster's newly formed sheep station on the Goulburn River, killing a shepherd and taking his sheep. The Native Police under C.L.J. de Villiers was called in to restore order.

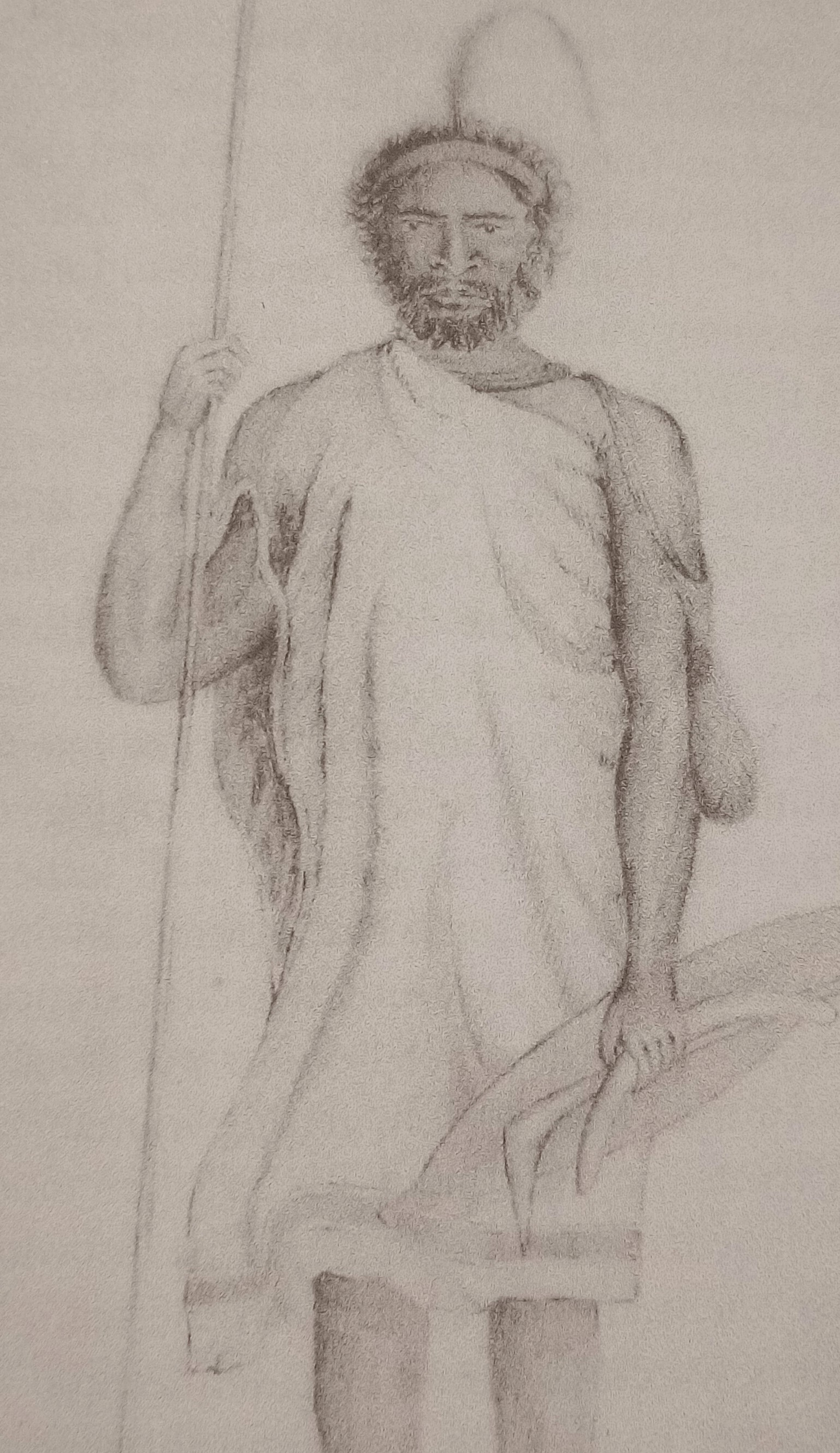
Taungurung resistance leader, Winberri

In early 1840, a Taungurung man named Burregregowel was wounded after being shot near the Coliban River in a punitive expedition led by Lt Frederick Russell of the NSW Mounted Police and the colonist Henry Monro. The son of Burregregowel, a man named Winberri, subsequently helped lead a campaign of armed resistance against the British.

Winberri and his Aboriginal followers raided Peter Snodgrass' property along the Yea River, holding Snodgrass' stockmen at gunpoint while taking their sheep and flour. Winberri had acquired firearms and referred to his men as his soldiers. He claimed the colonists' sheep should be as much his property as it was theirs because the sheep ate the same grass that his kangaroos ate, and that this was his country, not whiteman's country.

Winberri's armed gang continued the roam the region, holding up a supply cart, shooting at its driver and threatening shepherds at Murrindindi. In April 1840, they raided John Chisholm's Myrrhee station, killing one of his shepherds and taking four guns and a stash of ammunition.

They then proceeded across to the upper Broken River, where they held up Peter Stuckey's cattle station at what is now Barjarg. A skirmish developed and one of Winberri's men was wounded by gunfire, while a Wiradjuri stockman named Yarri working for Stuckey was also wounded by a spear thrown by another of Winberri's men.

Winberri's gang retreated after this skirmish but soon held up another run in the Delatite River region, threatening to shoot the manager of the property. The gang was also implicated in shooting two shepherds dead and stealing a herd of sheep at David Waugh's run also along the Delatite River in May.

Around the same time, another armed group combining Taungurung and Waywurru men, led by Pallanganmiddang men named Harlequin (Jaggeroger), Merriman (Minnup) and Mickey, were raiding properties along the upper Ovens River. In May, this group laid a "masterly" organised siege upon Dr George Mackay's Whorouly station, killing three horses and a number of cattle before retreating. They also hacked to death one of Mackay's stockman who was implicated in the rape of a black woman.

=== The Lettsom raid and mass-imprisonment of Taungurung ===
In October 1840, a large group of Taungurung people travelled to Melbourne to conduct a major corroborree with the Wurundjeri people. The meeting of around 400 Kulin men, women and children occurred at what is now Yarra Bend Park. In the early hours of Sunday 11 October, Major Lettsom with soldiers of the 28th Regiment and Border Police troopers under Frederick Powlett, stealthily surrounded the large group while they slept. The soldiers and troopers then surprised the gathering and arrested and chained almost the entire group, with only a few escaping. Several people were wounded during the arrest in what was to become known as the Lettsom Raid.

Winberri was soon identified and as he was being chained he broke loose and attempted to attack Lieutenant Francis Vignolles of the 28th Regiment with his waddy. Sergeant Leary of the Mounted Police shot Winberri dead before he could land a blow on the lieutenant.

The remaining 300 to 400 Aboriginal people were marched down Heidelberg Road and into Melbourne. The women, children and old men who lagged behind were forced to keep moving by being pricked with bayonets and clubbed with rifle butts. Numerous injuries were recorded.

The hundreds of Taungurung, Woiwurrung, Boonwurrung and Wurundjeri captives were herded down Collins Street and corralled into a yard adjoining the hospital, opposite the main barracks. Those identified as Wurundjeri, Woiwurrung or Boonwurrung were allowed to leave, but around 35 Taungurung men and boys remained imprisoned, chained together and incarcerated in a warehouse next to the barracks. That night some of the Taungurung attempted to escape from the warehouse. The soldiers guarding the warehouse discovered the attempt and shot dead a man and wounded another. Several others managed to escape.

Most of the Taungurung were afterwards released, including a leading man named Billy Hamilton (also known as Yabbee), but ten were remanded in custody to face trial for the "outrages" against the British colonists in the Goulburn River region. Turrukmunnin, Nandermiel, Logermakoon, Piengingoon, Kowinyowlett, Waverong and four others faced court in early January 1841, where nine of them were found guilty and sentenced to 10 years transportation to Cockatoo Island jail in Sydney Harbour.

On 14 January 1841, the nine convicted men were loaded onto a small vessel on the Yarra River. While travelling down the river, the nine Taungurung men chained in irons, jumped overboard and attempted to swim to liberty. Four were shot dead, the others escaping with various wounds. Turrukmunnin, who was 17 years old, was wounded and recaptured. He was later released.

Resistance by the Taungurung people still continued after the Lettsom Raid. As late as 1845, a gang of Taungurung men raided Alex Davidson's Acheron River property, killing an Indian coolie labourer.

=== Forced onto Aboriginal reserves ===
As early as 1839, Taungerong were being directed, under a system of Aboriginal Protectorates, to reside on small reserves as the colonists took their land. The Taungerong were advised a reserve had been established for them at Murneyong (later known as Mitchellstown) on the Goulburn River. James Dredge was the assistant Aboriginal Protector in charge and the young Taungerong leader (ngurungaeta) named Billy Hamilton (or Yabbee) was instrumental in negotiations involving his clan adapting to the new system.

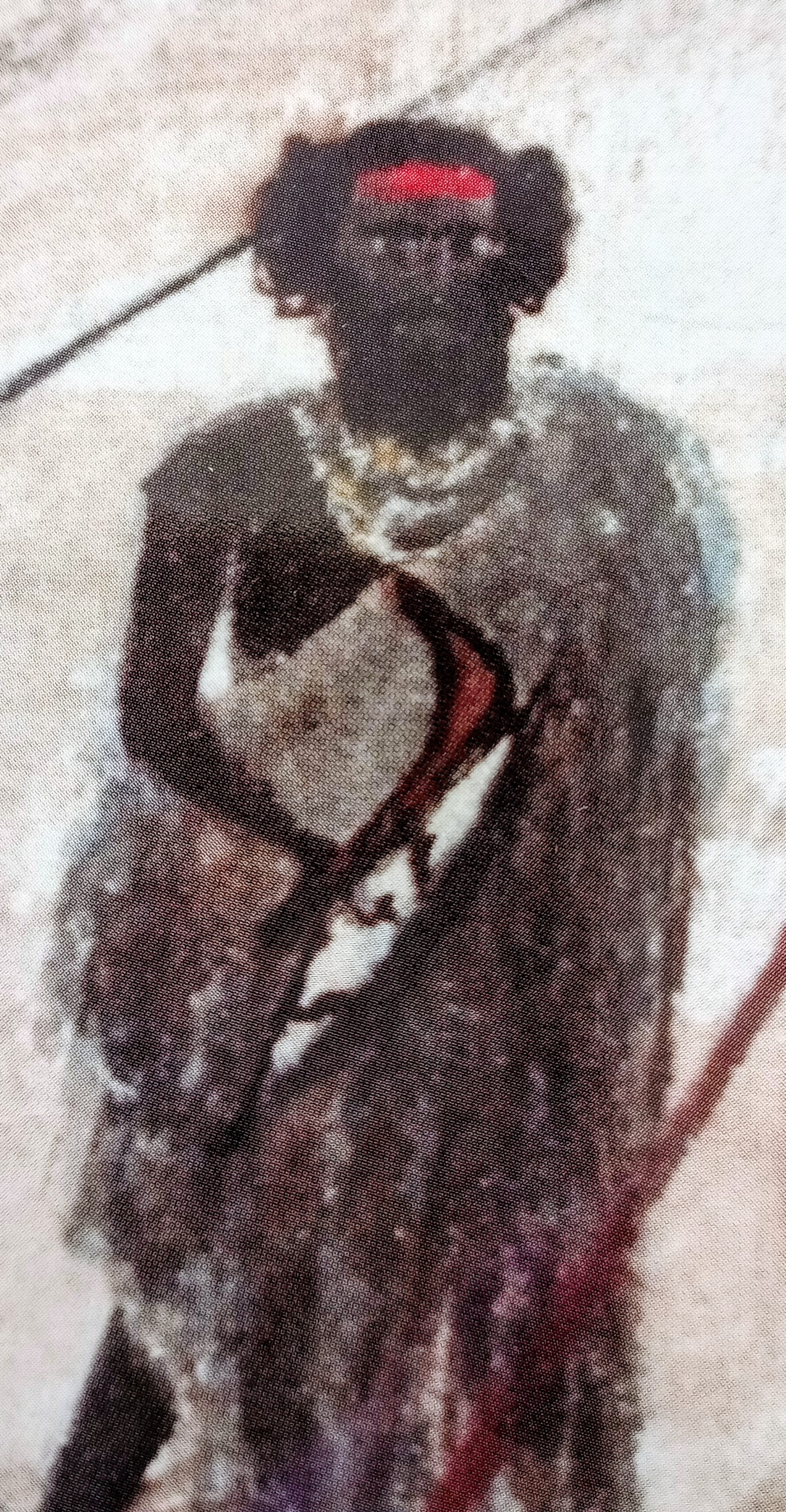
Drawing of Billy Hamilton (Yabbee) in 1845 by Henry Godfrey

The reserve was later moved further north along the Goulburn River to Mungalook (now known as the town of Murchison) and was eventually shut down in 1853. A Taungerong elder named Tatambo and his family continued to live a semi-traditional lifestyle in the area until at least 1870. Tatambo's remains and that of another dozen or so Taungerong are buried at Murchison cemetery.

By 1858, there were estimated to be only around 50 of the Goulburn River people left alive, and only 30 of the Devil's River clan. Their numbers before colonisation were believed to be approximately a thousand. Massacres, sexually transmitted diseases and influenza brought by the colonists all contributed to the decimation. Forced prostitution of the Taungurung's girls and boys to the settlers added to the destruction of their society.

In February 1859 some Wurundjeri elders, led by Simon Wonga and brother Tommy Munnering petitioned Protector William Thomas to secure land on behalf of the Taungurung clans for the Kulin at the junction of the Acheron and Goulburn rivers in Taungurung territory. Initial representations to the Victorian Government were positive, however the intervention of the most powerful squatter in Victoria, Hugh Glass, resulted in their removal to a colder site, Mohican Station, which was not suitable for agricultural land and had to be abandoned.

In March 1863 after three years of upheaval, the surviving Kulin leaders, among them Simon Wonga and William Barak, led forty Wurundjeri, Taungurung and Boonwurrung people over the Black Spur and squatted on a traditional camping site on Badger Creek near Healesville and requested ownership of the site. This became Coranderrk Station.

The Coranderrk establishment was poorly maintained by the government's Aboriginal Protection Board. Housing, sanitation, employment and food were all thoroughly inadequate. Kulin families who chose to stay on-country and not go to Coranderrk, had children forcibly removed to Coranderrk by the Board. The death rate at Coranderrk in 1875 reached 20% of the population of 150. Most of the 50 surviving people at Coranderrk were forced out in 1923 and moved to Lake Tyers Mission in Gippsland.

== Taungurung in modern times ==
The Taungurung Clans Aboriginal Corporation was registered as a Registered Aboriginal Party by the Victorian Aboriginal Heritage Council on 16 July 2009.

In 2021, the Taungurung Land and Waters council adopted a flag consisting of a rectangle diagonally divided by a yellow wavy line. (Heraldic) The right side is ocher with the 7 stars arranged into the constellation of the Pleiades, the left side is black.

== Notable people ==
- Winberri, resistance leader shot during the Lettsom raid
- Harlequin, resistance leader during the early 1840s
- Jackie Jackie, resistance leader during the early 1840s
- Merriman, resistance leader

== Sources ==
- "Alpine National Park Management Plan" (PDF). Department of Conservation and Environment. September 1992. Archived from the original (PDF) on 31 March 2012.
- Andrews, Alan (1986). Stapylton: With Major Mitchell's Australia Felix Expedition 1836. Blubber Head Press. ISBN 0908528140.
- Attwood, Bain (1999). "My Country. A history of the Djadja Wurrung 1837-1864". Monash Publications in History. 25: 7–9. ISSN 0818-0032.
- "EARLY HISTORY OF MANSFIELD". The Australasian. Vol. CXXIX, no. 4, 270. Victoria, Australia. 8 November 1930. p. 4 (METROPOLITAN EDITION) – via National Library of Australia.
- "Port Phillip". Australasian Chronicle. Vol. III, no. 189. New South Wales, Australia. 23 January 1841. p. 2 – via National Library of Australia.
- Barwick, Diane E. (1984). McBryde, Isabel (ed.). "Mapping the past: an atlas of Victorian clans 1835-1904". Aboriginal History. 8 (2): 100–131. JSTOR 24045800.
- "BENALLA CENTENARY: Story of the Faithfull massacre". Benalla Standard. No. 6393. Victoria, Australia. 5 February 1935. p. 4 – via National Library of Australia.
- Broome, Richard (2005). Aboriginal Victorians: A History Since 1800. Allen & Unwin. pp. 123–125. ISBN 1-74114-569-4.
- Cannon, Michael (1993). Black Land, White Land. Port Melbourne: Minerva. ISBN 1863303154.
- Clark, Ian D (2013). Goulburn River Aboriginal Protectorate. Ballarat: Ballarat Heritage Services. ISBN 9781876478032.
- Clark, Ian D. (1995). Scars in the Landscape: a register of massacre sites in western Victoria, 1803–1859 (PDF). AIATSIS. pp. 57–84. ISBN 0-85575-281-5.
- Clark, Ian (2014). The Travels of George Augustus Robinson, Chief Protector, Port Phillip Aboriginal Protectorate, 1839-1852. Ian D. Clark.
- "The Blacks". The Colonist. Vol. VI, no. 416. New South Wales, Australia. 24 June 1840. p. 2 – via National Library of Australia.
- Ellender, Isabel; Christiansen, Peter (2001). People of the Merri Merri. The Wurundjeri in Colonial Days. Merri Creek Management Committee. pp. 112–113. ISBN 0-9577728-0-7.
- Fels, Marie (2011). 'I Succeeded Once': The Aboriginal Protectorate on the Mornington Peninsula, 1839–1840 (PDF). ANU Press. ISBN 978-1-921-86212-0.
- "Lieutenant-Colonel Henry White". Finding Merriman.
- Macklin, Robert (2016). Hamilton Hume: Our Greatest Explorer. hachette. ISBN 9780733634055.
- Patterson, Roy Henry; Jones, Jennifer (2020). On Taungurung Land: Sharing History and Culture. Australian National University Press. ISBN 978-1-760-46407-3.
- Presland, Gary (1985). Aboriginal Melbourne: The Lost Land of the Kulin People (Second ed.). Harriland Press. pp. 45–46. ISBN 0-9577004-2-3.
- "Taungurung Clans Aboriginal Corporation". Department of Premier and Cabinet. 16 July 2009. Archived from the original on 14 October 2016.
