= Murrindindi River =

Murrindindi
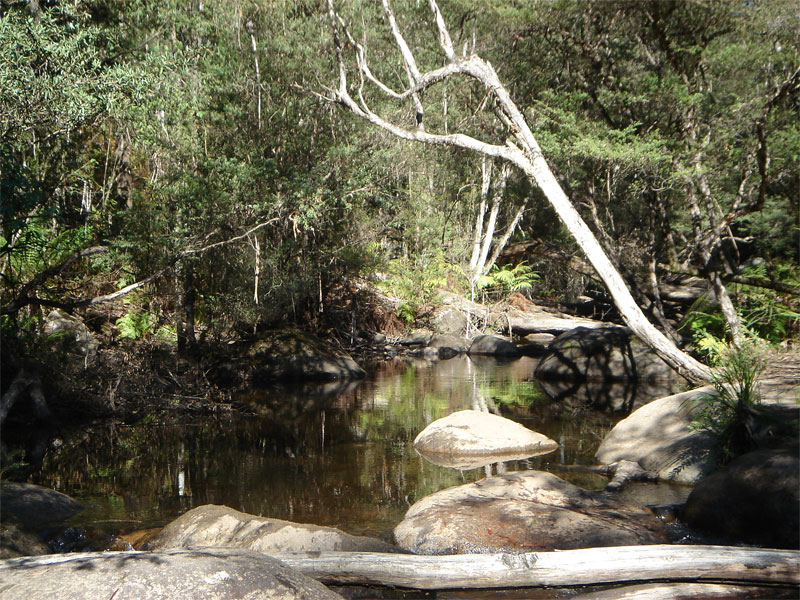
- The Murrindindi River, within the Murrindindi River Scenic Reserve

- Location of the Murrindindi River mouth in Victoria
- Etymology: After the pastoral run

Location
- Country: Australia
- State: Victoria
- Region: South Eastern Highlands bioregion (IBRA), Northern Country/North Central
- Local government area: Murrindindi
- Towns: Murrindindi

Physical characteristics
- Source: Victorian Alps, Great Dividing Range
  - location: below Yea Rock, near Mount Monda
  - coordinates: 37°29′55″S 145°37′9″E
  - elevation: 373 m (1,224 ft)
- Mouth: confluence with the Yea River
  - location: southwest of Limestone
  - coordinates: 37°16′34″S 145°28′22″E
  - elevation: 186 m (610 ft)
- Length: 26 km (16 mi)

Basin features
- River system: Goulburn Broken catchment, Murray-Darling basin
- Tributaries
  - left: Yellowdindi Creek
  - right: Bull Creek (Murrindindi River), S Creek, Falls Creek (Victoria), Ault Beeac Creek
- Nature reserve: Murrindindi River Scenic Reserve

The Murrindindi River, an inland perennial river of the Goulburn Broken catchment, part of the Murray-Darling basin, is located in the lower South Eastern Highlands bioregion and Northern Country/North Central regions of the Australian state of Victoria. The headwaters of the Murrindindi River rise on the western slopes of the Victorian Alps and descend to flow into the Yea River.

== Location and features ==
The Murrindindi River rises from the Great Dividing Range near Mount Monda, and flows northwest through the Murrindindi River Scenic Reserve between the Toolangi and Black Range State Forests. The river is joined by five minor tributaries, passing through the town of Murrindindi before reaching its confluence with the Yea River, southwest of Limestone, east of the Melba Highway. The river descends 187 metres (614 ft) over its 26-kilometre (16 mi) course.

The name of the river is derived from the name of the pastoral run. Gold was discovered in the river in 1866.

== See also ==
- List of rivers of Australia § Victoria
