= Yarra Falls =

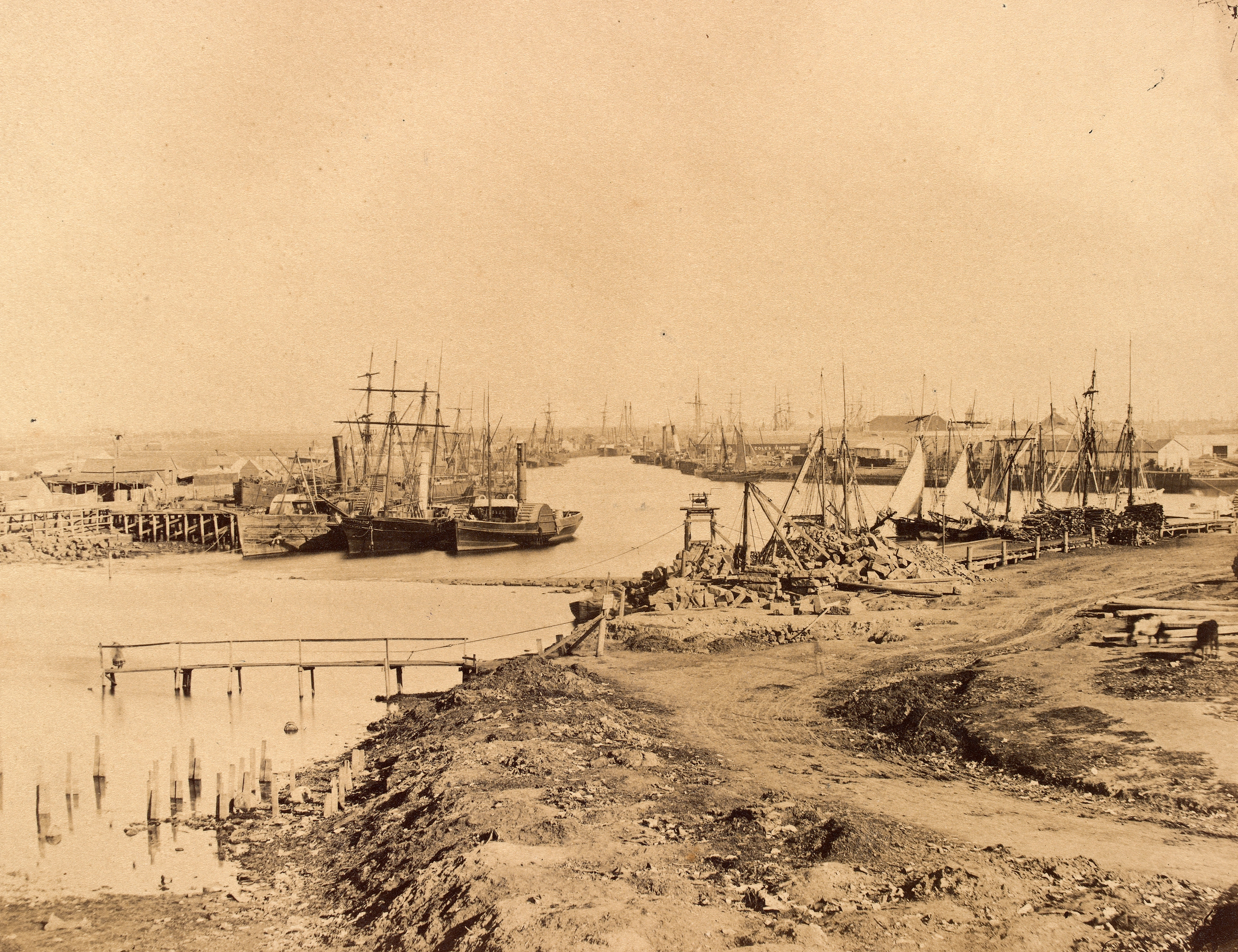
- Yarra Falls, in the midground, before its demolition
- Interactive map of Yarra Falls
- Coordinates: 37.820468°S 144.961229°E

Yarra Falls was a waterfall on the Yarra River in Melbourne, Australia that was demolished in 1883 through the use of dynamite in order to prevent a repeat of the floods of 1863 and 1878. It formed a low barrier, separating the brackish tidal water found downstream from the fresh water found above it, and in doing so provided potable water for the young settlement.

== Pre-settlement history ==
The Falls, called Yarra Yarra were important to the local Aboriginal nations, the Woiwurrung and the Boon wurrung, who used it as a crossing point between their lands, in order to negotiate trade and marriages. The location was also used to meet the other three members of the Kulin nation, in order to settle disputes, trade and hold corroborees.

== European history ==
In June 1835 John Batman arrived at Yarra Falls and immediately recognized it as the site of a new village, the only one of Australia's Capital Cities to have been identified as so before its founding.

In 1839 a dam was built upon the falls using convict labour in order to secure the fresh water supply for the growing city, but did not last long, nor did its replacement. In 1845 a bridge was built at the site by a private company, but this was replaced by a government funded Prince's Bridge in 1850, which was to stand until the demolition of the Falls, despite an attempt by "some scoundrel" to sabotage it by sawing through several of its supporting columns.

In 1845, the only son of John Batman, Charles Batman, drowned while fishing at the falls his father had discovered.

== Demolition ==
In 1879 Sir John Coode declared that the Falls must be demolished in order to prevent a repeat of previous floods by allowing free discharge of upstream water during heavy rains. After a delay of almost four years, this process was begun by the Harbour Trust by removing the previously constructed dam, but the removal of the natural obstructions through the use of dynamite was delayed by another month due to the trust being unwilling to risk accidental damage to the bridge without formal indemnification from the Department of Public Works.

The plan was to clear the reef to a uniform depth of 15 feet 6 inches, at an estimate cost of £20,000, with the existing depth being varied, with the highest points touching the surface of the water and the lowest reaching down to 15 feet, and the demolition was complete by 1883, having been funded by a combination of the Victorian Government and the Harbour Trust.
