= Ngurelban people =

Aboriginal Australian people from Victoria

The Ngurelban, also written as Ngurai-illamwurrung, Ngurraiillam, Noorilim and Orilim, are an Aboriginal Australian people of the state of Victoria.

== Language ==
Ngurrai-illam-wurrung
- Ngurraiillam, Noorilim
- Native to: Australia
- Region: Victoria
- Ethnicity: East Kulin
- Extinct: (date missing)
- Language family: Pama-Nyungan: Southeastern; Victorian; Kulin-Bungandidj; Kulinic; Kulin; Woiwurrung–Taungurung; Taungurung; Ngurrai-illam-wurrung

Language codes
- ISO 639-3: None (mis)
- Glottolog: None
- AIATSIS: S83
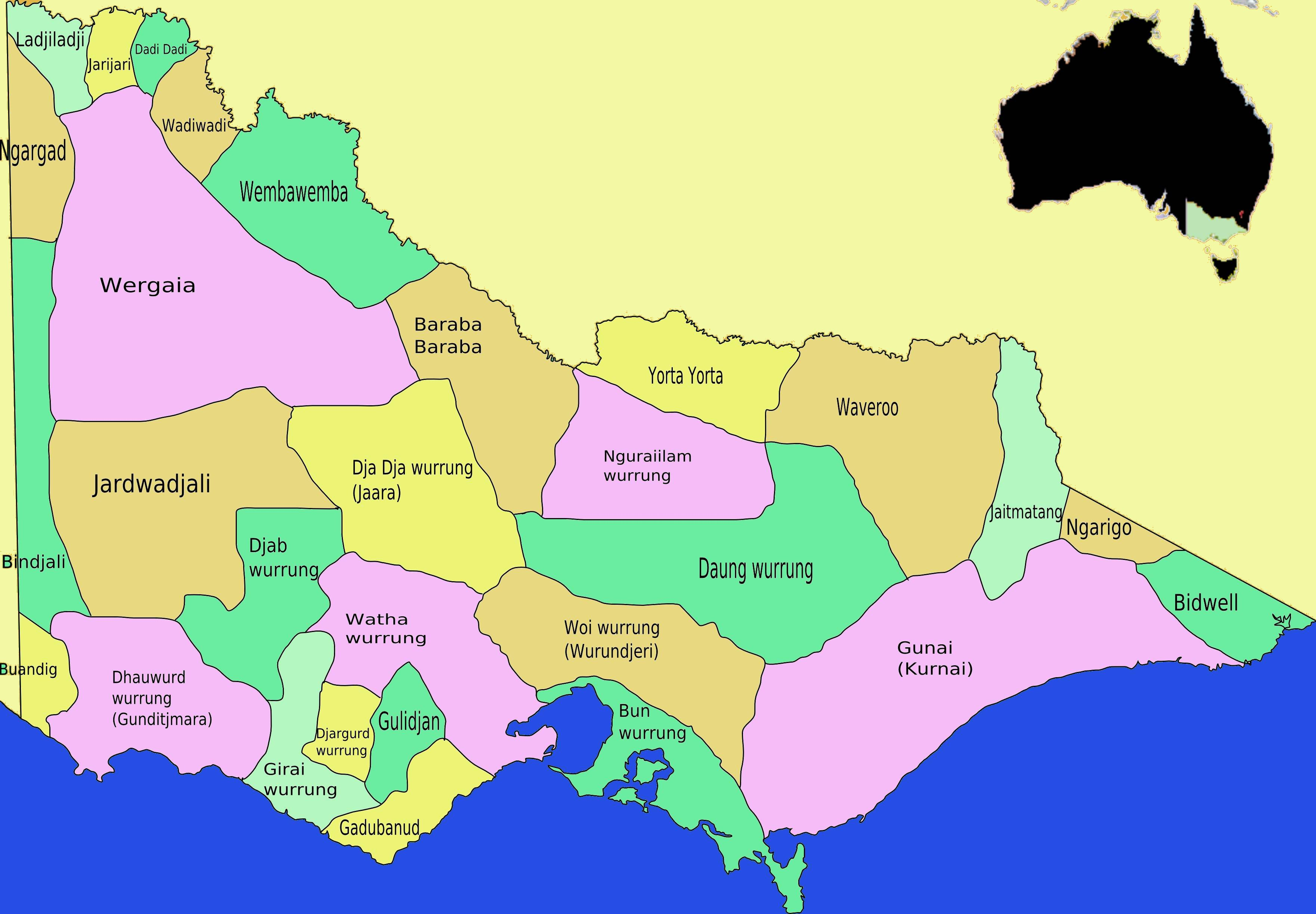
- Map of Victorian languages. Ngurai-illamwurrung is in the middle, in pink.

The Ngurelban language was similar to that of the Taungurung, the neighbouring related people to the southeast.

== Country ==
Ngurelban tribal territory takes in an estimated 3,000 sq. miles of land. According to Norman Tindale, it runs along the Goulburn River, (Note: There is possibly some confusion in these reports. Barkwick wrfites:'Tindale's 1974 description of a 'Ngurelban tribe' on the Campaspe merges Tuckfield's report with Curr's and Howitt's descriptions of clans speaking a different language at and east of the Campaspe.') has its northern boundary edging on Echuca, its western frontier probably not beyond Gunbower. It extended south of Shepparton along the Goulburn River to Old Crossing (Mitchellstown), and north of Seymour.

== Social organisation ==
The Ngurelban are considered to be very closely associated with the East Kulin Nations and are sometimes described as a northern group of the Daungwurrung people. To demonstrate this closeness, the mother of Wurundjeri leader William Barak was Ngurelban.

Ngurelban were organised according to three groups or clans:

- Benbedora to the northwest, around Colbinabbin and on the Campaspe River north of Elmore, known for keeping their distance and for having a relationship of tense rivalry with other groups
- Ngurrai-illam balug, a clan from along the Goulburn River around Murchison
- Gunung willam, a clan from the Campaspe River between Axedale and Elmore

== History of contact ==
By the late 1830s the pressure of the effects of grazing on their pastoral lands from livestock introduced by squatters had started to create serious problems for the Ngurelban. In 1839 one of them, Moonin Moonin, complained that:

Jumbuck and Bulgana (sheep and cattle) were eating and destroying Aboriginal game pastures and staples like yams and mirr-n'yong roots.

By 1842, the disastrous effects of British colonisation on the Ngurelban were evident in an interview with Chimbri, a ngurungaeta (leader) of the Gunung-willam clan from the Campaspe River area. Chimbri had lost many of the members of his family to the violence of the settlers saying that "white fellow plenty shoot them".

== Alternative names ==
- Gunn-el-ban
- Gnurellean
- Nouralung-bula
- Nguralung-bula
- Noorillim
- Ngooraialum
- Ngurilim
- Ooraialum (a mishearing that dropped the initial ng-), Oorilim, Oorallim
- Woo-ral-lim
- Panyool
- Paboinboolok, Panpandoor
