= Kulin nation =

Indigenous Australian ethnic group

- Status: Tribal Confederation
- Capital: Yarra Falls
- Demonym: Kulin

Government
- Establishment: Pre-contact

Population
  - Estimate: 725 (1830)

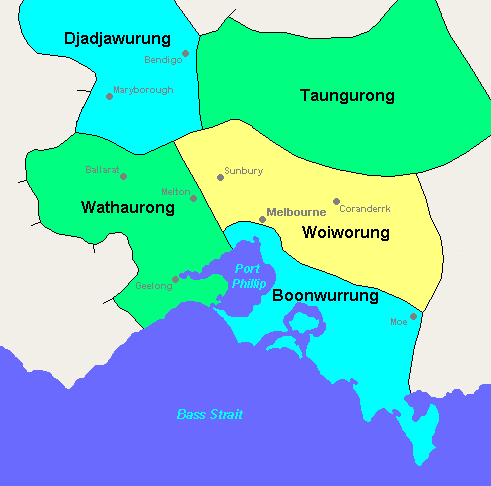
Basic map of the five languages of the Kulin nation

The Kulin nation is an alliance of several Aboriginal nations in the south of Australia, around Port Phillip, up into the Great Dividing Range and the Loddon and Goulburn River valleys, who share culture and language.

== History ==
Before British colonisation, the associated tribes spoke five related languages. These languages are spoken by two groups: the eastern Kulin group of Woiwurrung–Taungurung, Boonwurrung and Ngurai-illam-wurrung; and the western language groups of Wadawurrung and Djadjawurrung language.

The central Victoria area has been inhabited for at least 31,000 years before European settlement, based on radiocarbon dating of a hearth excavated at the Keilor archaeological site near the Maribyrnong River. (Note: Presland (1997) suggests a figure of approximately 40,000 years for Aboriginal habitation of the Maribyrnong River valley near Keilor, though no specific page number has yet been verified: (Presland 1997:)) At the time of British settlement in the 1830s, the collective populations of the Woiwurrung, Boonwurrung and Wadawurrung tribes of the Kulin nation was estimated to be approximately 725. (Note: Presland describes in some detail the archaeological evidence regarding aboriginal life, culture, food gathering and land management, particularly the period from the flooding of Bass Strait and Port Phillip from about 7–10,000 years ago, up to the European colonisation in the 19th century. (Presland 1994, p.)) The Kulin lived by fishing, cultivating murnong (also called yam daisy; Microseris) as well as hunting and gathering, and made a sustainable living from the rich food sources of Port Phillip and the surrounding grasslands.

Due to the upheaval and disturbances from British settlement from the 1830s on, there is limited physical evidence of the Kulin peoples' collective past. However, there are a small number of registered sites of cultural and spiritual significance in the Melbourne area.

== People ==
- Woiwurrung – including the Wurundjeri clans
- Boonwurrung
- Taungurung – also known as the Daungwurrung people
- Ngurraiillam

The Kulin nation is generally understood to comprise five language groups: the four eastern groups above, together with the Wathaurong and the Djadjawurrung, who occupied the western territories. These six groups are sometimes divided geographically, with the four eastern groups referred to collectively as the East Kulin Nation and the latter two as the West Kulin Nation.

At certain times of the year, these nations would meet at Yarra Falls to settle disputes, to trade, and to hold corroborees.

=== Diplomacy ===
When foreign people passed through or were invited onto tribal lands, the ceremony of tanderrum – freedom of the bush – was performed. This was intended to allow for safe passage and temporary access and use of land and resources by foreign people. It was a diplomatic rite involving the landholder's hospitality and a ritual exchange of gifts.

== Bibliography ==
- Anon. (n.d.). "Indigenous connections to the site" (PDF). Archived from the original (PDF) on 31 August 2007.
- Clark, Ian D.; Cahir, David A. (2004). Tanderrum: 'Freedom of the Bush'. Castlemaine, Victoria: Friends of Mount Alexander Diggings. ISBN 0-9579308-2-8.
- Clark, Ian D. (1990). Aboriginal Languages and Clans: An Historical Atlas of Western and Central Victoria, 1800–1900. Monash Publications in Geography. Vol. 37. Melbourne: Department of Geography and Environmental Science, Monash University. ISBN 090968541X.
- Eidelson, Meyer (1997). The Melbourne Dreaming. A Guide to the Aboriginal Places of Melbourne. Canberra: Aboriginal Studies Press. ISBN 0-85575-306-4.
- —— (2001). "The Footballer, First in the league (about James Wandin)". Walks in Port Phillip. A guide to the cultural landscapes of a City (PDF). City of Port Phillip. pp. 35–37. ISBN 0-646-41199-3. Archived from the original (PDF) on 30 October 2008.
- Maunder, Patricia (11 January 2008). "Melbourne dreamtime a reality". The Age.
- Pascoe, Bruce (2017). Dark Emu. ISBN 978-1-4893-8039-5. OCLC 1089338508.
- Presland, Gary (1994) [First published 1985]. Aboriginal Melbourne: The Lost Land of the Kulin People (Second ed.). Harriland Press. ISBN 0-9577004-2-3.
- —— (1997). The First Residents of Melbourne's Western Region. Forest Hill, Victoria: Harriland Press. ISBN 0-646-33150-7. OCLC 222368168.
