= Yea River =

Yea
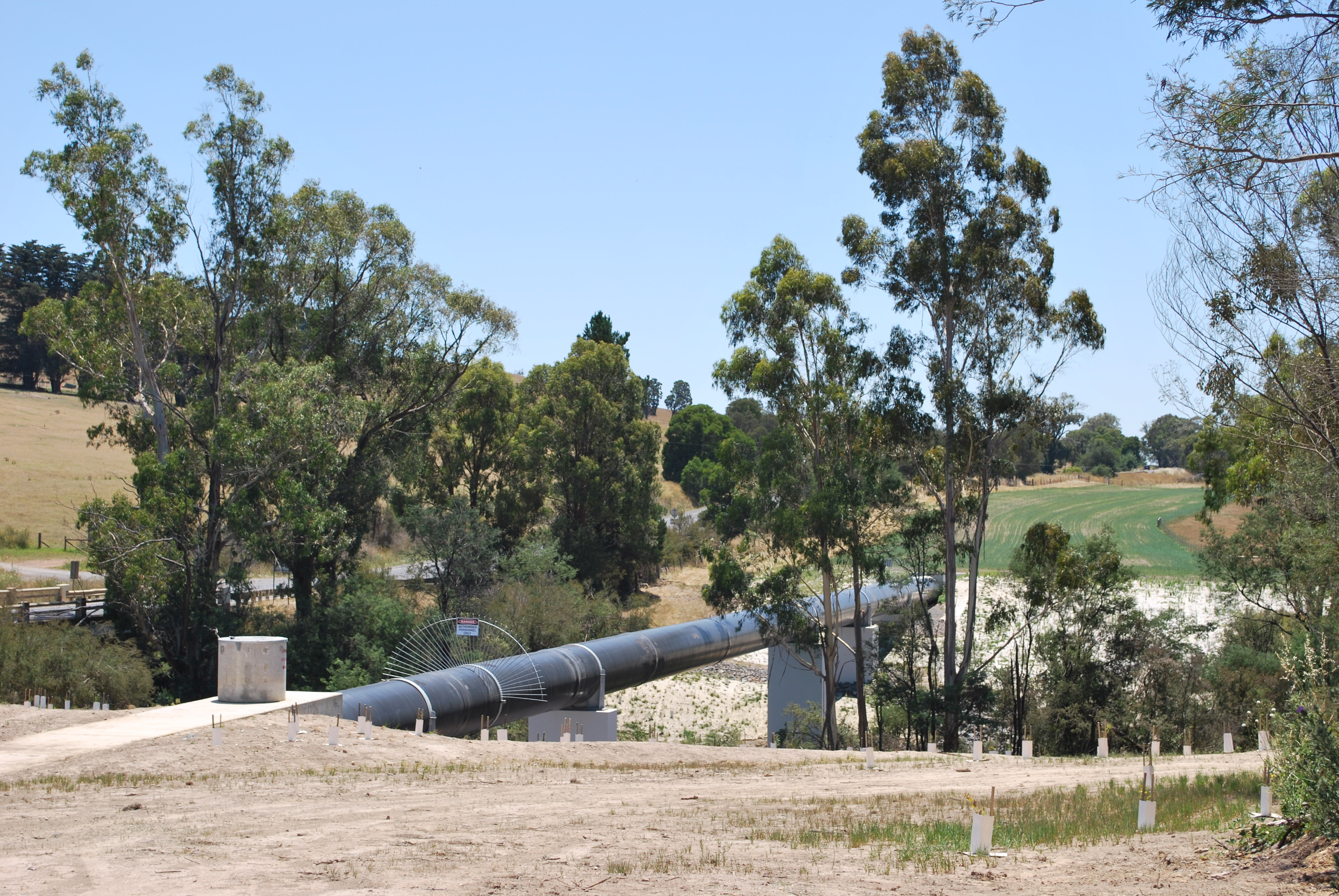
- Pipeline crossing the Yea River at Glenburn

- Location of the Yea River mouth in Victoria
- Etymology: In honour of Colonel Lacy Walter Yea
- Native name: Kayigai (Daungwurrung)

Location
- Country: Australia
- State: Victoria
- Region: South Eastern Highlands bioregion (IBRA), Northern Country/North Central
- LGA: Murrindindi
- Towns: Toolangi, Castella, Glenburn, Yea

Physical characteristics
- Source: Great Dividing Range
  - location: below Mount Tanglefoot
  - coordinates: 37°19′56″S 145°28′27″E
  - elevation: 566 m (1,857 ft)
- Mouth: confluence with the Goulburn River
  - location: northwest of Yea
  - coordinates: 37°30′53″S 145°31′10″E
  - elevation: 162 m (531 ft)
- Length: 74 km (46 mi)

Basin features
- River system: Goulburn Broken catchment, Murray-Darling basin
- Tributaries
  - left: Captain Creek, Rocky Creek (Victoria), Rellimeiggam Creek, Ti Tree Creek
  - right: Katy Creek, Murrindindi River
- Nature reserve: Murrindindi River Scenic Reserve

The Yea River, an inland perennial river of the Goulburn Broken catchment, part of the Murray-Darling basin, is located in the lower South Eastern Highlands bioregion and Northern Country/North Central regions of the Australian state of Victoria.

== Location and features ==
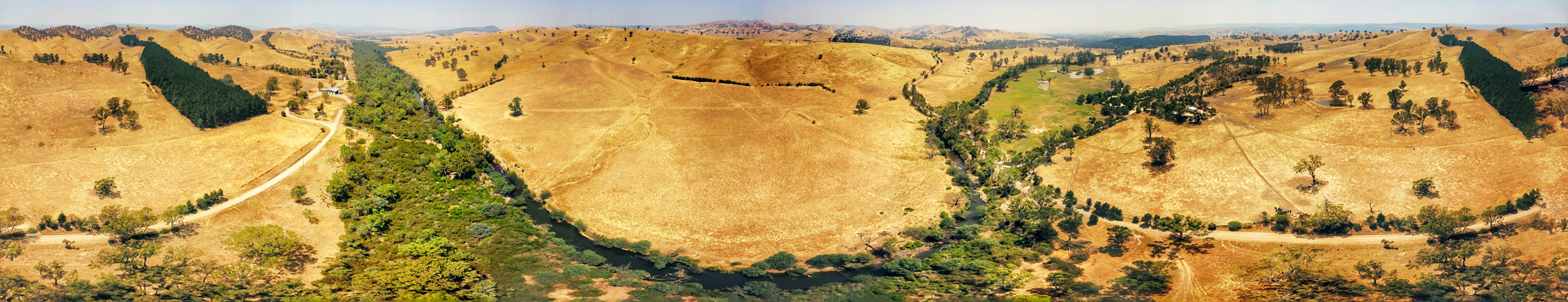
Yea River Conservation Reserve Jan 2020

The Yea River rises in the Toolangi State Forest north-east of Toolangi and northwest of Mount Tanglefoot, part of the Great Dividing Range. The river generally flows in a northerly direction, generally aligned with the Melba Highway which crosses the river in its lower reaches. The river is joined by six tributaries including the Murrindindi River, flows east and north of the town of Yea before reaching its confluence with the Goulburn River, near Ghin Ghin Bridge. The river descends 403 metres (1,322 ft) over its 74-kilometre (46 mi) course.

The river is also crossed by the Goulburn Valley Highway, east of Yea.

== Etymology ==
The suspected Aboriginal Taungurung language name for the river is Kayigai, with no clearly defined meaning. A surveyor's map of c. 1860 gives Kayigai or Muddy Creek, so it is likely that was the Aboriginal name of the river.

The river was called Muddy Creek in 1824 by explorers Hume and Hovell because of its muddy banks. The river was renamed when or soon after the town of Muddy Creek was renamed Yea. The river, like the town is named in honour of Colonel Lacy Walter Yea – a British Army colonel killed during the Crimean War in 1855, the year that Yea was founded.

== See also ==
- List of rivers of Australia § Victoria
