= Anthony Cottrell =

Australian farmer

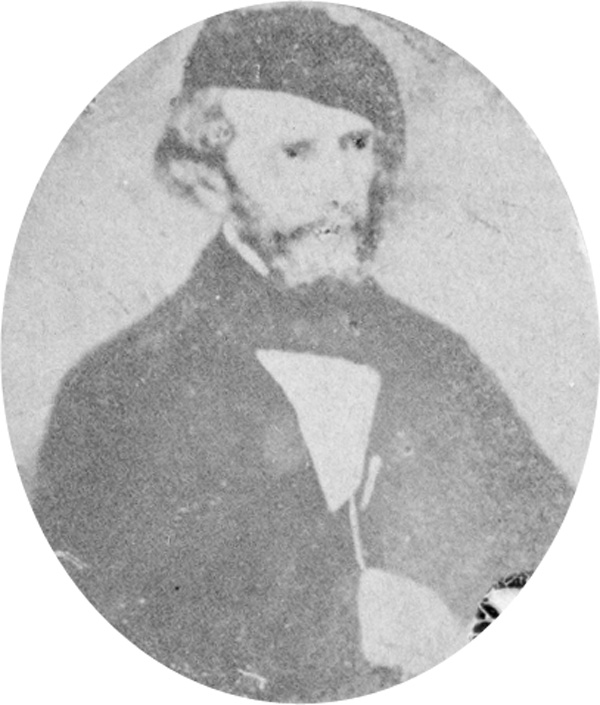
Anthony Cottrell. Photo included in the famous photographic montage entitled "The Explorers and Early Colonists of Victoria. He is number 18 in the montage.

Anthony Cottrell (21 March 1806 – 4 May 1860) was a farmer and one of fifteen investors in the Port Phillip Association. The son of Ellen and William Cottrell, a farmer living in the South Esk County of Cornwall, Tasmania. He immigrated to Tasmania in 1824 on the 'Cumberland'. He was to later befriend John Batman and John Charles Darke, fellow Tasmanian investors and move to Port Phillip on the Yarra River in 1835 as one of the original settlers in what was to become Victoria. He later returned to Tasmania. He is officially remembered in the name of a hill and an outer western Melbourne suburb, Mount Cottrell, near Melton.

== Marriage and business interests ==
In January 1835 he married Frances Solomon. Seven months later he moved to Port Phillip to take up his new holdings he had invested and acquired via the later disputed Batman Treaty. The young couple quickly had three children who were amongst the first Europeans born in the new settlement: Ellen Lowes, 1835, Anthony Crisp, 1837, and Harriet Ann 1839.

The extraordinary claims to large areas of land made by members of the Association after Joseph Gellibrand returned from his exploration in February 1836 were such that each began to ship stock to holdings of 40,000 acres (160 km²) or more. The members of the Association claimed in 1838 to have shipped between 2500 and 500 sheep each, and Cottrell is listed with 1000. Of course the Government of NSW did not allow them to keep this land acquired by "treaty" with the aborigines, and it is not known what happened to Cottrell's claim or to his sheep. His share in the Association was sold to banker and fellow member Charles Swanston in July 1838 for 411 pounds, which corresponded to one seventeenth of the value after expenses of the assessed value of the 10,416 acres (42 km²) which the Government eventually allowed them to purchase.

By March 1839 Cottrell was later known as a stock agent, the first in Geelong, and as an auctioneer in the area West of Melbourne. Cottrell sold a wide range of Batman's possessions under orders from his executors seeking to recover funds to repay Batman's creditors after his death in May 1839. Cottrell's acquisition of this place of business came by virtue of an interesting legal agreement with Batman in January 1839, for which the deed still exists, in which he undertook to pay Eliza Batman, John Batman's wife who was about to leave for England, 60 pounds a year for the rest of her life in exchange for a peppercorn rental on a building in William Street.

In September 1840 he returned to Tasmania where several more children were born to Anthony and Frances Cottrell: William Joseph later known as William Ostler 1842; Fanny Randall 1843; Sarah Alicia Barbara 1844; and Joseph Solomon 1846. Cottrell's original land on the Nile River passed into other hands in 1839 and he acquired another smaller property of 5 acres (20,000 m^{2}) near Launceston that year. His later years were lived in Hobart where Anthony Cottrell died at his home in Elphinstone Road on 4 May 1860, aged 54.
