= Proclamation of Governor Bourke =

The Proclamation of Governor Bourke was a document written by Sir Richard Bourke, KCB, the Governor of New South Wales, and issued by the British Colonial Office on 26 August 1835.

The proclamation was prompted by the actions of John Batman, who when establishing a settlement at what is now Melbourne and would become the colony of Victoria, agreed to a treaty with the local Aboriginal inhabitants. Bourke's proclamation effectively declared Batman's treaty null and void, and implemented the concept of terra nullius—that the continent belonged to no-one prior to settlement by the British Crown.
