= History of Victoria =

History of the Australian state of Victoria

The history of Victoria refers to the history of the Australian state of Victoria and the area's preceding Indigenous and British colonial societies.

Before British colonisation of Australia, many Aboriginal peoples lived in the area now known as Victoria. After the first Europeans settled there in October 1803, in September 1836 the area became part of the colony of New South Wales, known as the District of Port Phillip. In July 1851, the District of Port Phillip was established as its own colony, becoming the Colony of Victoria, with its own government within the British Empire. During the 1850s, gold was discovered in Clunes and Buninyong in Ballarat in 1851, which was the start of the Victorian Gold Rush. In 1901 it became a state of the Commonwealth of Australia.

== Aboriginal history ==
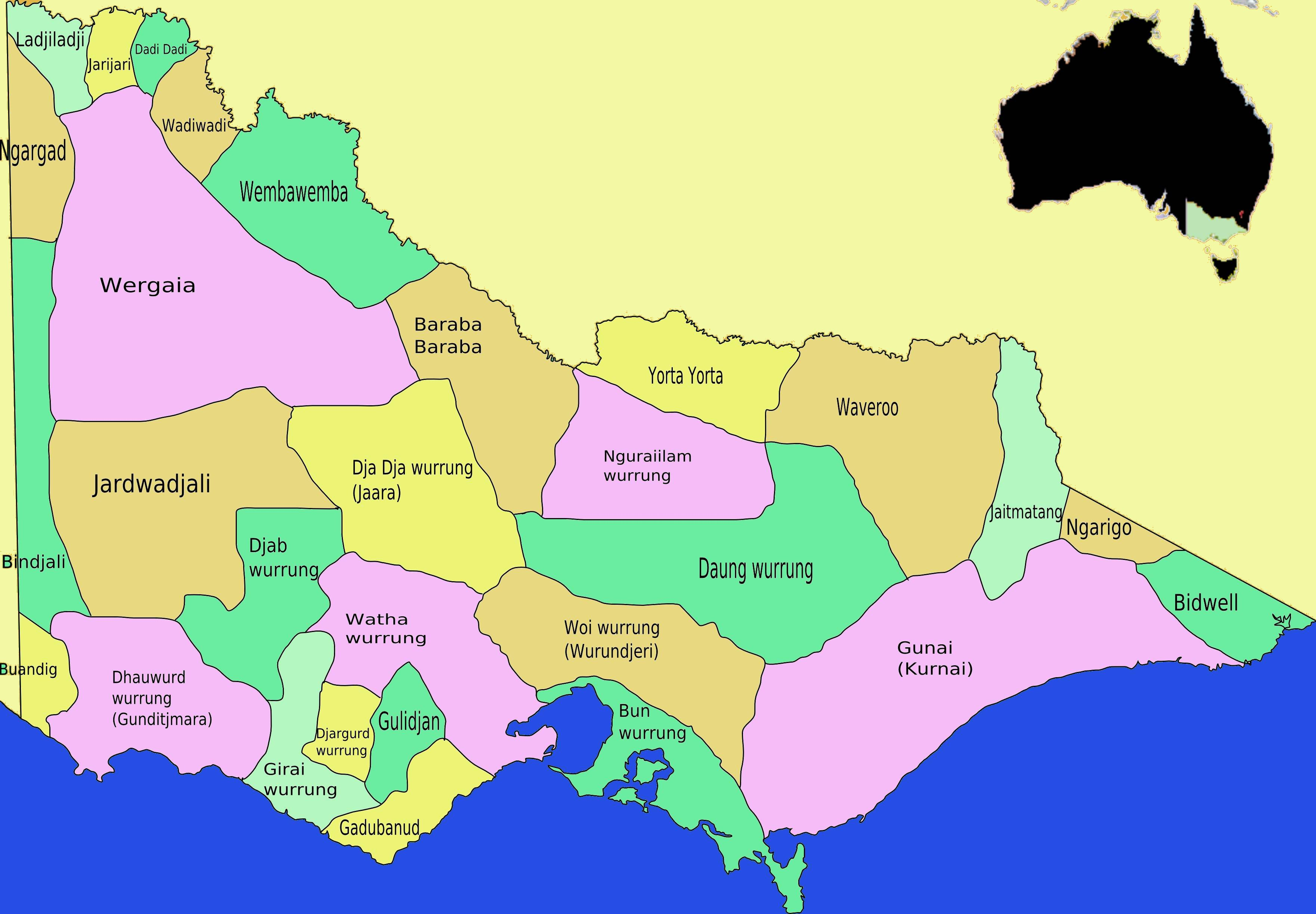
Map of Aboriginal peoples of Victoria language territories

The state of Victoria was originally home to many Aboriginal nations that had occupied the land for tens of thousands of years. According to Gary Presland, Aboriginal people have lived in Victoria for about 40,000 years, living a semi-nomadic existence of fishing, hunting and gathering, and farming eels, as is evident in the Budj Bim heritage areas.

At the Keilor Archaeological Site a human hearth excavated in 1971 was radiocarbon-dated to about 31,000 years BP, making Keilor one of the earliest sites of human habitation in Australia. A cranium found at the site has been dated at between 12,000 and 14,700 years BP.

Archaeological sites in Tasmania and on the Bass Strait Islands have been dated to between 20,000 – 35,000 years ago, when sea levels were 130 metres below present level allowing Aboriginal people to move across the region of southern Victoria and on to the land bridge of the Bassian plain to Tasmania by at least 35,000 years ago.

During the Ice Age about 20,000 years BP, the area now the bay of Port Phillip was dry land, and the Yarra and Werribee rivers joined to flow through the heads then south and south west through the Bassian plain before meeting the ocean to the west. Tasmania and the Bass Strait islands became separated from mainland Australia around 12,000 BP, when the sea level was approximately 50 metres (160 ft) below present levels. Port Phillip was flooded by post-glacial rising sea levels between 8000 and 6000 years ago.

Oral history and creation stories from the Wathaurong, Woiwurrung and Boonwurrung languages describe the flooding of the bay, which they call Narm-Narm; it was previously covered in scrubby tea-tree and was a kangaroo hunting ground. Aboriginal creation stories describe how Bunjil was responsible for the formation of the bay, or the bay was flooded when the Yarra River was created. Another story says that Balayang the bat created the oceans, rivers, and creeks.

== Early European exploration ==
Coming from New Zealand in 1770, Lieutenant James Cook in HM Bark Endeavour sighted land at Point Hicks, about 70 km west of Gabo Island, before turning east and north to follow the coast of Australia.

Ships sailing from Great Britain to Sydney crossed the Indian Ocean and Southern Ocean, sailing around Van Diemen's Land before turning north to their destination. Several captains viewed the expanse of water between Van Diemen's Land and the east coast of New South Wales and wondered whether it was a large bay or a strait. Survivors of Sydney Cove, wrecked in the Furneaux Group of islands, also thought it might be a strait.

To clear up the question, Governor John Hunter sent George Bass to explore thoroughly the coast in a whaleboat. After reaching Wilsons Promontory and Western Port in January 1798 bad weather and lack of provisions forced him to return to Sydney. Bass returned with Matthew Flinders in December 1798 in Norfolk and sailed through the strait, proving its existence.

In December 1800, Lieutenant James Grant in HMS Lady Nelson, on way from Cape Town to Sydney, sailed through Bass Strait from west to east. Governor King, disappointed at the vagueness of Grant's chart, sent him back to survey the strait more thoroughly. Bad weather prevented him from proceeding beyond Western Port, where he stayed for five weeks, planting wheat, Indian corn, peas, rice, coffee and potatoes on Churchill Island off Phillip Island.

In 1801 Harbinger, under John Black, was the second vessel to sail through Bass Strait en route to Port Jackson. She reached the coast near Cape Otway on 1 January 1801, then veered sharply south-west to the north-western tip of Governor King's Island (now King Island), which Black named after the Governor of New South Wales, Philip Gidley King. She then sailed easterly towards Wilsons Promontory. Proceeding around the tip of the promontory, Black discovered the Hogan Group, which he named after the ship's owner Michael Hogan. Harbinger arrived in Port Jackson on 12 January 1801.

In January 1802 Lieutenant John Murray in Lady Nelson visited Western Port and entered Port Phillip on 14 February. He named Arthur's Seat, explored Corio Bay and formally took possession of the bay (which he named Port King) for Britain. The bay was then known as Narm-Narm by the people of the Kulin Nation, and Murray called the bay Port King after the Governor of New South Wales, Philip Gidley King. On 4 September 1805, King formally renamed it Port Phillip, in honour of his predecessor Arthur Phillip. Murray chose to base the Lady Nelson off what is now known as Sorrento Beach.

During this voyage, Murray records in his journal his first encounter with local Aboriginal peoples in the eastern Melbourne region. This initially friendly encounter started with trading, eating, and gifting, and was suddenly interrupted by a violent ambush by another group of Aboriginal people. The crew in response shot at the Aboriginal people, and continued to shoot at them as they fled, inflicting likely mortal wounds on two of them. Murray then ordered the ship carronades to be fired at the fleeing Aboriginal people.

"They were all clothed in opossum skins and in each basket a certain quantity of gum was found. ... if we may judge from the number of their fires and other marks this part of the country is not thin of inhabitants. Their spears are of various kinds and all of them more dangerous than any I have yet seen."

Three weeks later the French explorer Nicolas Baudin sailed through the strait from east to west and was the first to properly survey the coast to the west. In April 1802, a French expedition ship Le Naturaliste under Jacques Hamelin explored the area around French Island, as part of the Baudin expedition to Australia. It named the island Ile des Français, since Anglicised as French Island.

On 26 April 1802, Flinders, unaware of Murray's visit, entered Port Phillip in Investigator, climbed Arthur's Seat, rowed to Mornington and across to the Bellarine Peninsula and climbed the You Yangs.

In January 1803 Acting-Lieutenant Charles Robbins in the schooner HMS Cumberland sailed right around Port Phillip. With him were acting surveyor-general Charles Grimes, Mr James Meehan and gardener James Fleming. At the head of the bay they found a river and followed it upstream where it soon divided. They followed the western branch and named it the Saltwater River (the present Maribyrnong) to what is now Braybrook, and then the eastern fresh-water branch (the Yarra) to Dights Falls. They had a friendly meeting with local Aboriginal people and returned to their ship via Corio Bay. They concluded that the best site for a settlement would be on the freshwater at the northern head of the bay, but were unenthusiastic about the soil and its agricultural potential.

== 1803 British settlement ==
With Britain involved in the French revolutionary wars, Governor King was concerned that Bass Strait could harbour enemy raiders, and that in peace time it could provide an important trade route and trading base. The appearance of Baudin's ships served to reinforce the concern that France was interested in the area. King was also looking for an alternative settlement for the increasing number of convicts in Sydney and to reduce the pressure on food resources. Port Phillip, with a favourable climate and rich fishing and sealing resources, seemed an ideal location for another settlement.

A full description of Murray's and Flinders' discoveries, together with King's thoughts on settlement, but not Grimes' report, reached England just as HMS Calcutta was being prepared to send a shipload of convicts to Sydney. In February 1803, Lord Hobart the Secretary of State changed the destination to Port Phillip. On 24 April 1803 HMS Calcutta, commanded by Captain Daniel Woodriff, with Lieutenant-Colonel David Collins as commander of the expedition, left England accompanied by the store-ship Ocean. The expedition consisted of 402 people: 5 Government officials, 9 officers of marines, 2 drummers, and 39 privates, 5 soldiers' wives, and a child, 307 convicts, 17 convicts' wives, and 7 children. One of the children was the eleven-year-old John Pascoe Fawkner, later a founder of Melbourne, who accompanied his convicted father and mother.

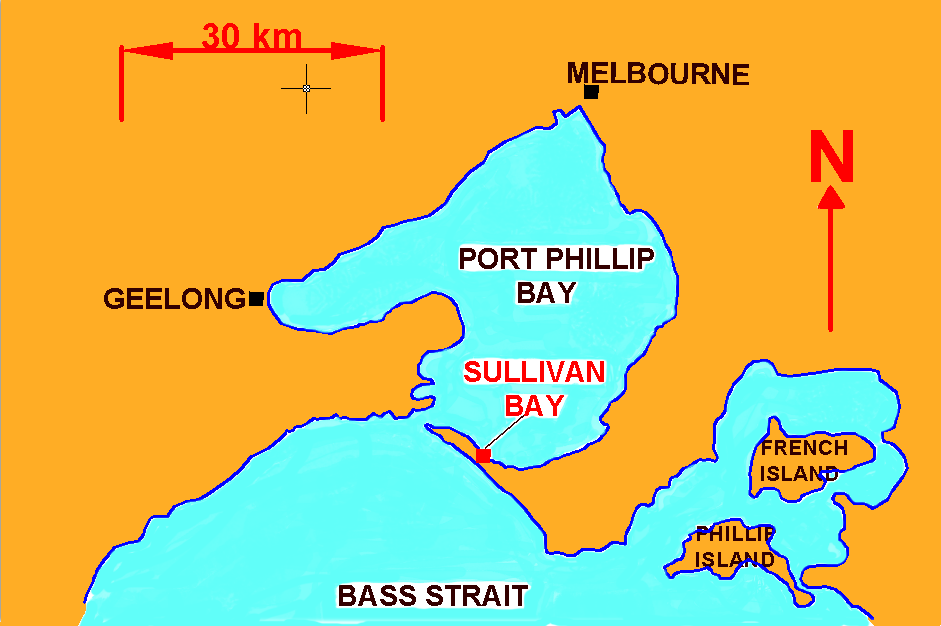
Map of Sullivan Bay, Victoria

The party entered Port Phillip on 9 October 1803 and chose a site at Sullivan Bay near present-day Sorrento.

Collins was soon disappointed with the area. Reports from exploring parties led by Lieutenant James Tuckey and surveyor George Harris described strong currents, sandy soil, poor timber, swampy land and scarce fresh water. They also clashed with the Wathaurung people near Corio Bay, killing their leader – the first Aborigines known to have been killed by settlers in Victoria.

Collins reported his criticisms to Governor King, who supported him and recommended moving the settlement. On 18 December Calcutta departed for Port Jackson, and the party was prepared for evacuation. This was achieved in two voyages of Ocean in January and May 1804, assisted by HMS Lady Nelson which had been surveying Port Dalrymple on the north coast of Van Diemens Land. The party was transferred to the fledgling settlement of Hobart, founded by Lieutenant John Bowen as a penal colony at Risdon Cove in September 1803.

The brief settlement at Sorrento achieved little and left only a few relics for modern tourists to observe. Collins has been criticised for not investigating the bay thoroughly, in particular, the northern head with its fresh-water river, and for being too hasty in his condemnation of the bay. The site of the settlement is now a reserve incorporating four graves from the period.

When Collins departed, several convicts – who had escaped when they heard the colony was leaving for Van Diemen's Land – were left behind. They were presumed killed by Aboriginal people. However, William Buckley survived, meeting Wathaurong people on the Bellarine Peninsula and living with them for the next 32 years. (In 1835 he became aware of John Batman's Port Phillip Association camp and reintroduced himself to Europeans.)

For the next thirty years a few sealers and whalers rested on the southern coast of New South Wales.

== Interest grows in the north coast of Bass Strait ==
Following a number of exploratory expeditions south from the settled areas of New South Wales, the pastoralist Hamilton Hume and former sea-captain William Hovell set off to explore the country to the south in October 1824. They crossed the Murray River (which they named the Hume River) near the site of Albury and continued south. They crossed the Goulburn River (which they called the Hovell) above the site of Yea, and were forced to detour around mountains. They arrived on the shores of Corio Bay, mistakenly believing it to be Western Port, and returned to Sydney in January 1825, lavishly praising the quality of the country they had passed through.

In April 1826 the French explorer d'Urville visited one of the sealers' camps on Phillip Island. Worried by this renewed French interest in the area and encouraged by Hume and Hovell's reports, Governor Darling ordered a settlement to be established at Western Port. A small convict party arrived in November 1826 at Corinella under the command of Samuel Wright, to protect the approaches to the bay. Hovell, accompanying the party, soon realised that this was not where he had arrived two years before, and reported unfavourably on the swampy land around Western Port, although he referred to better land to the north. In spite of clearing the land for crops, and the construction of a fort and houses, the settlement was abandoned in April 1828.

The shortage of good pasture in Van Diemen's Land led to settlers there showing interest in the country across Bass Strait, following Hume and Hovell's reports and stories of visiting sealers. Pastoralist John Batman and surveyor John Wedge planned an expedition from Launceston in 1825 but permission was not granted. A number of settlers sought land over the next few years, but Governor Darling turned down all requests.

A sealer and whaler William Dutton built a hut on the shore of Portland Bay in 1829 where he resided for a time prior to the arrival of the Hentys.

The expedition down the Murray River by Charles Sturt in 1830 again aroused interest in settlement in the south. In April 1833 Edward Henty, returning to Van Diemen's Land from Spencer Gulf called in to Portland for a cargo of oil, and was much impressed. In November 1834 John Hart, another sailor, reported favourably in Launceston on Western Port. It was now inevitable that settlement would occur.

In June 1834 banker Charles Swanston advised his client George Mercer that land was scarce in Van Diemen's Land and he should invest across Bass Strait. Pastoralists John Aitken and George Russell suggested forming a partnership, and in August 1834 a group of eight Launceston capitalists formed what became the Port Phillip Association. On 19 November 1834 Edward Henty landed in Portland Bay and began the first permanent European settlement on the north coast of Bass Strait.

== Permanent European settlement ==
Victoria's first successful British settlement was at Portland, on the west coast of what is now Victoria. Portland was settled on 19 November 1834 by the Henty family, who were originally farmers from Van Diemen's Land (Tasmania). When Major Thomas Mitchell led an expedition to the region from Sydney in 1835, arriving at Portland in August 1836, he was surprised to find a small but prosperous community living off the fertile farmland.

In 1835, John Pascoe Fawkner and the Port Phillip Association (led by John Batman) started the Port Phillip settlement that later become known as Melbourne.

=== Borders ===
The District of Port Phillip was formally established as an administrative division within the Colony of New South Wales in September 1836, though with ill-defined borders. In 1839, the District was defined as consisting of all the lands within New South Wales south of 36°S latitude, and between 141°E (that is, the border with the future Colony of South Australia) and 146°E longitude. Coinciding with the introduction of a fixed-price land sale scheme in January 1840, the District was expanded north to follow the course of the Murrumbidgee River from its source to the Pacific coast at Moruya. However, the border was retracted south to the Murray River after extensive opposition in Sydney, including from the Legislative Council, all of whom were appointed by the Sovereign or the Governor of the Colony. When the Legislative Council was expanded and restructured to include 12 appointed members and 24 members elected by eligible landowners, taking effect from the 1843 colonial elections, the newly created electoral districts included Port Phillip (to be represented by 5 members) and the Town of Melbourne. On 1 July 1843, a proclamation formalised the border as running from Cape Howe, to the nearest source of the Murray River, and then along the course of the Murray to the border with South Australia.

Borders of the District of Port Phillip within the Colony of New South Wales

formalised in 1839

January 1840

1 July 1843 – 1 July 1851

Elected representatives for Port Phillip and Melbourne needed to be in Sydney to serve in the Legislative Council, placing them at a great distance from the areas they represented, and they were consequently considered ineffective and out-of-touch by locals. In protest and in support of a campaign for independence, the 1848 election scheduled for 27 July was disrupted by not nominating candidates for Port Phillip and putting forward for the Town of Melbourne the incumbent Secretary of State for War and the Colonies in the British Cabinet, Earl Grey. Grey received nearly 75% of the vote despite Grey having never visited the Colony and being ineligible as a current member of the British Parliament. A second writ was issued to elect five representatives for Port Phillip in October 1848. Following the strategy involving Earl Grey, the nominees included the Duke of Wellington, Lord Palmerston, Lord Brougham, Lord John Russell, and Sir Robert Peel but local representatives were elected. Grey never attempted to take up his seat and it was declared vacant in 1850 and a replacement elected. The independence campaign continued and led Grey to introduce the Australian Constitutions Act 1850 (13 & 14 Vict. c. 59 (Imp)) into the British Parliament, separating the District of Port Phillip from New South Wales to become the Colony of Victoria from 2 July 1851. The separation occurred along the 1843 borders and still apply to the modern State of Victoria. The same Act created bicameral legislatures and instituted self-government for each colony.

=== Conflict over resources ===
With the dispossession of Aboriginal peoples from their lands with the establishment of sheep runs by squatters, conflict over resources and land use inevitably occurred. One highly notable incident called the Convincing Ground massacre occurred in Portland Bay in 1833 or 1834 in a possible dispute about a beached whale between whalers and the Kilcarer gundidj clan of the Gunditjmara people.

Melbourne was founded in 1835 by John Batman, also from Van Diemen's Land and quickly grew into a thriving community, although at great human cost to the original inhabitants. Its foundation was the result of an invasion of wealthy squatters, land speculators and their indentured servants (including ex-convicts) who arrived from 1835, in a race with one another to seize an 'empty' country. The British Crown and colonial governments did not recognise prior Aboriginal ownership of their lands, waters and property, in spite of claiming that Aborigines fell within the protection of the law as British subjects.

Early in 1836, Mr Franks, one of the first immigrants to the region, and his shepherd were found dead as a result of steel hatchet wounds to the head. His station was near Cotterill's Mount, called the Sugarloaf, near the river Exe, now Werribee. Upon discovering the scene, and a nearby food store which appeared to have been ransacked, George Smith travelled to Point Gellibrand and formed an exploratory band. The party was sent out led by tour of the Melbourne tribe, and encountered a camp from the Indigenous Wathaurong tribe, whereupon an unclear incident occurred. Port Philip Police Magistrate Captain William Lonsdale advised the Colonel Secretary that no harm was inflicted on the Aboriginal people, however Wathaurong histories report that 35 of their people were murdered in retaliatory violence. The Traralgon Record newspaper reported in 1915 that the party "took vengeance on the murderers" (referring to the untried Wathaurong people), while The Cornwall Chronicle of Tasmania reported with approval in 1836 that the band had scouted the Wathaurong camp overnight, and in the morning launched an attack with the intent of "annihilating them". The incident is today remembered as "The Mount Cottrell massacre".

Between 1836 and 1842, Victorian Aboriginal groups were largely dispossessed of territory bigger than England. Although the British Colonial Office appointed 5 "Aboriginal Protectors" for the entire Aboriginal population of Victoria, arriving in Melbourne in 1839, they worked "...within a land policy that nullified their work, and there was no political will to change this." "It was government policy to encourage squatters to take possession of whatever [Aboriginal] land they chose,....that largely explains why almost all the original inhabitants of Port Phillip's vast grasslands were dead so soon after 1835". By 1845, fewer than 240 wealthy Europeans held all the pastoral licences then issued in Victoria and became the patriarchs "...that were to wield so much political and economic power in Victoria for generations to come."

Regarding the infamous Trial of R vs Tunnerminnerwait and Maulboyheener, "Tragically two of these (Aboriginal) men, Tunnerminnerwait (known as Jack) and Maulboyheenner (known as Bob, or sometimes called Timmy or Jimmy), became the first people executed in the Port Phillip District. This took place in 1842, a mere seven years after John Batman's treaties with the Kuhn people, when the two Tasmanian Aboriginal men were publicly hanged for murder." The Tunnerminnerwait and Maulboyheenner public marker exists at the place of execution near the site of the Old Melbourne Gaol, with artwork by Brook Andrew and Trent Walter.

A severe financial crisis took place in 1842–3, mainly due to the Government demanding from the banks the large rate of 7% for all moneys deposited with them, the result of land sales. The banks had to charge their customers from 10 to 12% for loans, very often on questionable securities. It was then accelerated by Lord John Russell's instructions that all lands out of town boundaries to be sold at only £1 per acre. Sheep that had been bought at from 30s to 40s per head are now sold at less than 2s. The Insolvent Court was rushed by all classes of the community.

== Separation from New South Wales ==
The first petition for the separation of the Port Phillip District (or 'Australia Felix') from New South Wales was drafted in 1840 by Henry Fyshe Gisborne and presented by him to Governor Gipps. Gipps, who had previously been in favour of separation, rejected the petition.

Agitation of the Port Phillip settlers continued and led to the establishment of Port Phillip District as a separate colony on 1 July 1851. The British Act of Parliament separating Port Phillip District from New South Wales, and naming the new colony "Victoria" (after Queen Victoria) and providing it with a Constitution, was signed by Queen Victoria on 5 August 1850. Enabling legislation was passed by the New South Wales Legislative Council to take effect on 1 July 1851. This was formally the founding moment of the Colony of Victoria, with separation from New South Wales established by section 1 of the 1851 Act. La Trobe became the new colony's first Lieutenant-Governor.

In 1851, the white population of the new colony was still only 77,000, and only 23,000 people lived in Melbourne. Melbourne had already become a centre of Australia's wool export trade.

== 1850s gold rush ==
In 1851 gold was first discovered in Clunes and Buninyong near Ballarat, and subsequently at Bendigo. Later discoveries occurred at many sites across Victoria. This triggered one of the largest gold rushes the world has ever seen. The colony grew rapidly in both population and economic power. In ten years the population of Victoria increased sevenfold from 76,000 to 540,000. All sorts of gold records were produced including the "richest shallow alluvial goldfield in the world" and the largest gold nugget. Victoria produced in the decade 1851–1860, twenty million ounces of gold, one third of the world's output.

Immigrants arrived from all over the world to search for gold, principally from the British Isles and particularly from Ireland. Many Chinese miners worked in Victoria, and their legacy is particularly strong in Bendigo and its environs. Although there was some racism directed at them, there was not the level of anti-Chinese violence that was seen at the Lambing Flat riots in New South Wales. However, there was a riot at Buckland Valley near Bright in 1857. Conditions on the gold fields were cramped and unsanitary – an outbreak of typhoid at Buckland Valley in 1854 killed over 1,000 miners.

In 1854 there was an armed rebellion against the government of Victoria by miners protesting against mining taxes (the "Eureka Stockade"). This was crushed by British troops, but some of the leaders of the rebellion subsequently became members of the Victoria Parliament, and the rebellion is regarded as a pivotal moment in the development of Australian democracy.

== Colonial politics ==
In 1857, reflecting the growing presence of Irish immigrants, in Victoria the British Empire had its first Catholic government leaders: John O'Shanassy as Premier, and the former Young Irelander, Charles Gavan Duffy his deputy. Melbourne's Protestant establishment was ill-prepared "to countenance so startling a novelty". In 1858–59, Melbourne Punch cartoons linked Duffy and O'Shanassy with images of the French Revolution to undermine their Ministry. One famous Punch image, "Citizens John and Charles", depicted the pair as French revolutionaries holding the skull and cross bone flag of the so-called Victorian Republic.

In 1862 Duffy's Land Act attempted, but failed, through a system of extended pastoral licences, to break the land-holding monopoly of the so-called "squatter" class. In 1871 Duffy led the opposition to Premier Sir James McCulloch's plan to introduce a land tax, on the grounds that it unfairly penalised small farmers, and himself was briefly Premier (June 1871 to June 1872).

In 1866, the Victorian parliament passed the "McCulloch Tariff", which was the first recognisably and substantially protectionist piece of legislation in Australian tariff history, applying 10% duties to a range of manufactured commodities; there is no evidence, however, that it had an effect on the colony's manufacturing. Although, further increases in protectionism in the late nineteenth century were consequential for Victoria manufacturing.

The first foreign military action by the colony of Victoria was to send troops and a warship to New Zealand as part of the New Zealand Wars. Troops from New South Wales had previously participated in the Crimean War.

== Kelly Gang ==
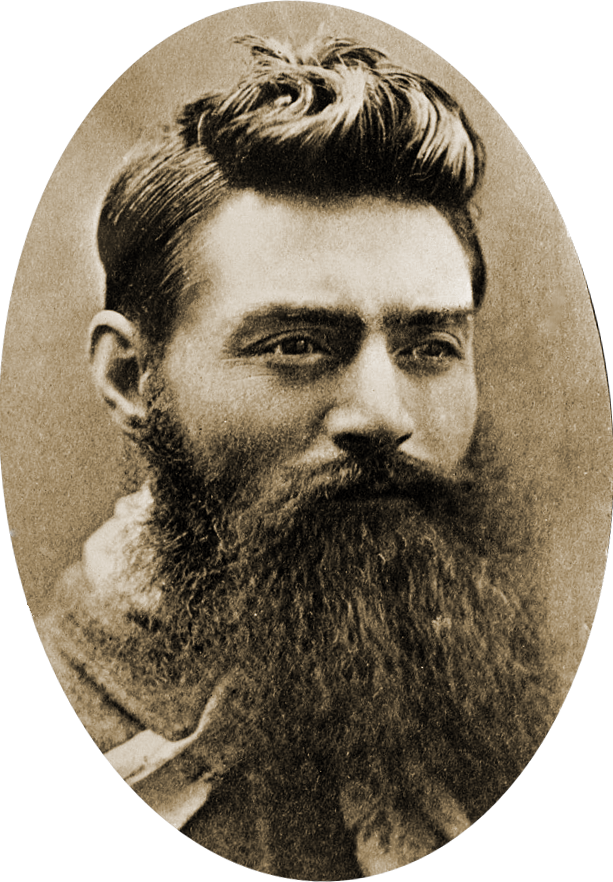
Ned Kelly the day before his execution in 1880.

From 1878 to 1880 Victoria was the location of the celebrated bushranger Ned Kelly and his gang. Historian Geoffrey Serle has called Kelly and his gang "the last expression of the lawless frontier in what was becoming a highly organised and educated society, the last protest of the mighty bush now tethered with iron rails to Melbourne and the world". In the century after his execution in Melbourne in 1880, Kelly became a cultural icon, inspiring numerous works in the arts and popular culture, and is the subject of more biographies than any other Australian.

== Depression of 1893 ==
A period of prosperity in the 1880s led to a wild speculation in land and buildings, and money poured in from England. Land companies, mortgage societies, municipal bodies, building societies, and a host of other organisations all clamoured for a share in the good things that were on offer, and probably £40,000,000 flowed into Victoria during a period of six years. With so much money in circulation, a fictitious prosperity of a feverish sort resulted. The banks issued notes to the value of millions of pounds, and trade and industry flourished as never before. The reaction came quickly. Public confidence subsided like a pricked balloon. A run commenced on the banks, and the bursting of the boom brought with it widespread disaster.

In 1893, 14 banks failed, twelve of those with 905 branches throughout Australia, had liabilities assessed at £166,000,000, and thousands of people lost the whole of their possessions. Bank notes in many cases became worthless, and Victoria reached the farthest depth of a financial depression. Unemployment became widespread, wages and prices dropped and bankruptcies followed one another in disturbing sequence. The most drastic retrenchments were made by the Government and public bodies.

== 1901 federation ==
At the beginning of 1901, following a proclamation by Queen Victoria, Victoria ceased to be an independent colony and became a state in the Commonwealth of Australia. Victorian and Tasmanian politicians were particularly active in the Federation process.

As a result of the gold rush, Melbourne became the financial centre of Australia and New Zealand. Between 1901 and 1927, Australia's Parliament sat in Melbourne while Canberra was under construction. It was also the largest city in Australia at the time, and the second largest city in the Empire (after London).

== World War II ==
Main articles: Australian home front during World War II, and Military history of Australia during World War II

== See also ==
- History of Melbourne
