= Foundation of Melbourne =

Forming of the city of Melbourne in Australia

This article is part of the series
History of Australia
Capital cities
Adelaide
Brisbane
Canberra
Darwin
Hobart
Melbourne
Perth
Sydney

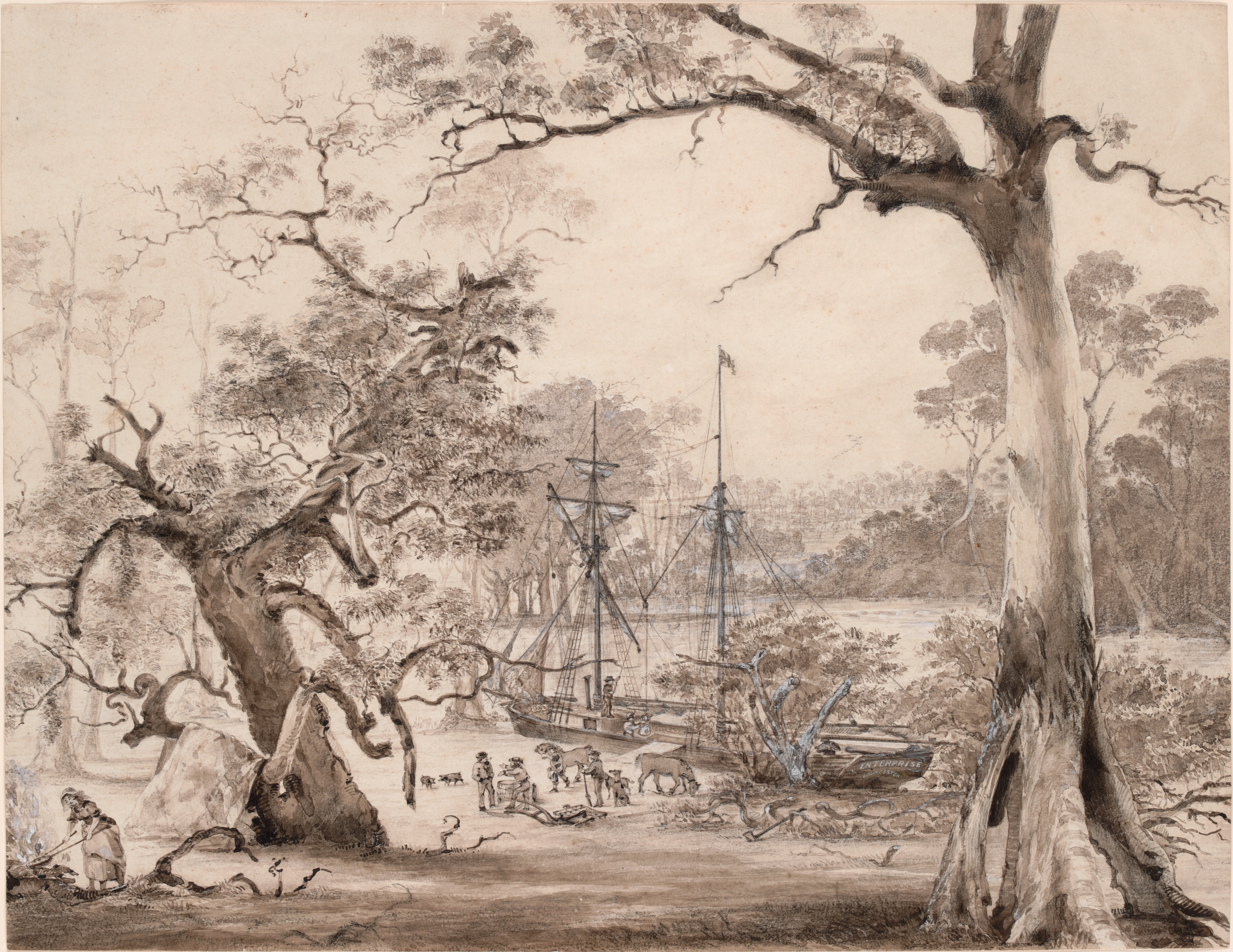
The Enterprize at the site of Melbourne

The city of Melbourne was founded in 1835. The exact circumstances of the foundation of Melbourne, and the question of who should take credit, have long been matters of dispute.

== Exploration ==
A series of colonisers, mostly operating from Sydney, explored the south-east coast of the Australian continent. In 1797 George Bass discovered Bass Strait, the passage between the Australian mainland and Van Diemen's Land (Tasmania); Bass sailed as far west as Western Port. Other navigators included James Grant in 1800. In 1802 John Murray in the Lady Nelson became the first recorded person to sail into Port Phillip, but he did not reach the northern end of the bay. He was followed shortly after by Matthew Flinders. In January 1803, Charles Robbins and Charles Grimes in the schooner Cumberland explored the whole of the bay, and found the mouth of the Yarra River, on which they rowed as far as Dights Falls at Collingwood. In October 1803 a convict settlement was established at Sullivan Bay at the mouth of Port Phillip, but this was abandoned and relocated to Van Diemens Land in January 1804.

The Hume and Hovell expedition passed just to the north of present-day Melbourne in December 1824, before reaching Port Phillip at Corio Bay. Other than the escape of convict William Buckley, this marks the only recorded visit by Europeans between 1804 and 1835.

== Settlement ==
In 1834 Edward Henty and his brothers established the first permanent settlement in Victoria at Portland Bay.

When news of the Hentys' actions reached Launceston, John Batman and a group of investors founded the Port Phillip Association, a grouping of Tasmanian bankers, graziers and East India Company retirees, with the intention of settling at Port Philip. In April 1835, Batman hired a sloop called the Rebecca and sailed across the Strait and up Port Philip to the mouth of the Yarra. He explored a large area in what is now the northern suburbs of Melbourne, as far north as Keilor, ascending Mount Kororoit. As the land he travelled through was mostly treeless, and covered in dense swards of kangaroo grass (Themeda triandra), it was, he wrote, "Land of the best description, equal to any in the world... the most beautiful sheep pasturage I ever saw in my life."

== Batman's Treaty ==
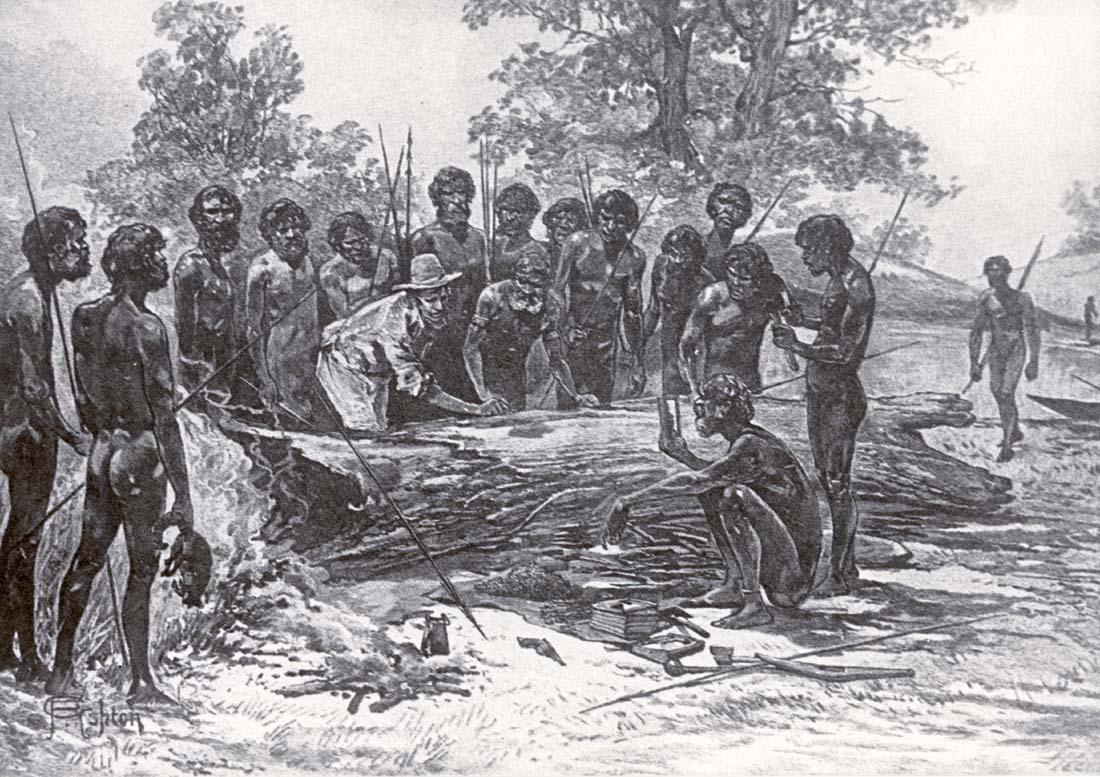
1880s Artist impression of the Treaty being signed

On 6 June Batman recorded in his journal that he had signed a treaty with the local Aboriginal people, the Wurundjeri. In this treaty Batman purported to buy 2,000 km^{2} (772 sq mi) of land near the Yarra River and another 400 km^{2} (154 sq mi) around Geelong, on Corio Bay to the south-west. In exchange he gave the eight "chiefs" whose marks he acquired on his treaty a quantity of blankets, knives, tomahawks, scissors, looking-glasses, flour, handkerchiefs and shirts.

The treaty was significant as it was the first and only documented time when Europeans negotiated their presence and occupation of aboriginal lands, according to historian Richard Broome, although it was later declared void by the Governor of New South Wales, Richard Bourke, and its authenticity has been strongly questioned by some historians like Alistair Campbell. It is likely that the Europeans interpreted the negotiations and ceremonies as a purchase of land while the Kulin believed they were conducting a tanderrum ceremony which allows temporary access and use of the land.

Batman then sent a party up the Yarra by boat. On 8 June he wrote in his journal: "So the boat went up the large river... and... I am glad to state about six miles up found the River all good water and very deep. This will be the place for a village." This last sentence later became famous as the "founding charter" of Melbourne, but it is not at all clear whether Batman was referring to the Yarra or its tributary the Maribyrnong River. The map Batman later produced does not correspond well with the actual geography of the area.

== Tasmanian settlement ==
Batman returned to Launceston and began plans to mount a large expedition to establish a settlement on the Yarra. John Pascoe Fawkner also had not been idle during the period since news of the Henty settlement at Portland had reached him. He also bought a ship, the schooner Enterprize. He met with Batman and assured him that he was not intending to settle at the site of Batman's discoveries, but he in fact had every intention of doing so. The Enterprize sailed on 4 August, with a party of intending settlers, although Fawkner was not aboard because the local sheriff would not allow him to leave until he paid his many debts.

After looking around the area, the acting commander of the expedition, John Lancey, chose a spot for the settlement, where, on 30 August 1835, the ship was anchored and the goods aboard unloaded. The spot was on the north bank of the Yarra, roughly between the present Spencer St Bridge and the Kings Bridge, in what is now called Enterprize Park (see also Batman Park and Enterprize (1830 ship)).

Meanwhile, Batman had sailed from Launceston in the Rebecca on 20 July, but he had spent several weeks at a temporary camp site at Indented Head on the western side of the bay. Here he was amazed to meet an Englishman, William Buckley, a former convict who had escaped from the settlement at Sorrento in 1803 and who had lived with the Aboriginal people around Port Phillip for more than 30 years. So it was not until 2 September that Batman's party reached the Yarra, where they were dismayed and angry to find Fawkner's people already in possession.

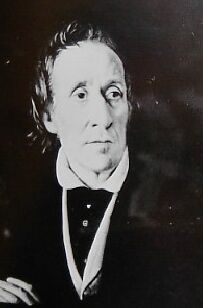
John Pascoe Fawkner

After a tense standoff, the two groups decided that there was plenty of land for everybody, and when Fawkner arrived on 16 October with another party of settlers, he agreed that they should start parcelling out land and not dispute who was there first. It was in his interests to do this, since an outbreak of violence would make it even less likely that Governor Bourke would recognise the settlement and the legal land titles of the settlers.

== Establishment of Melbourne ==
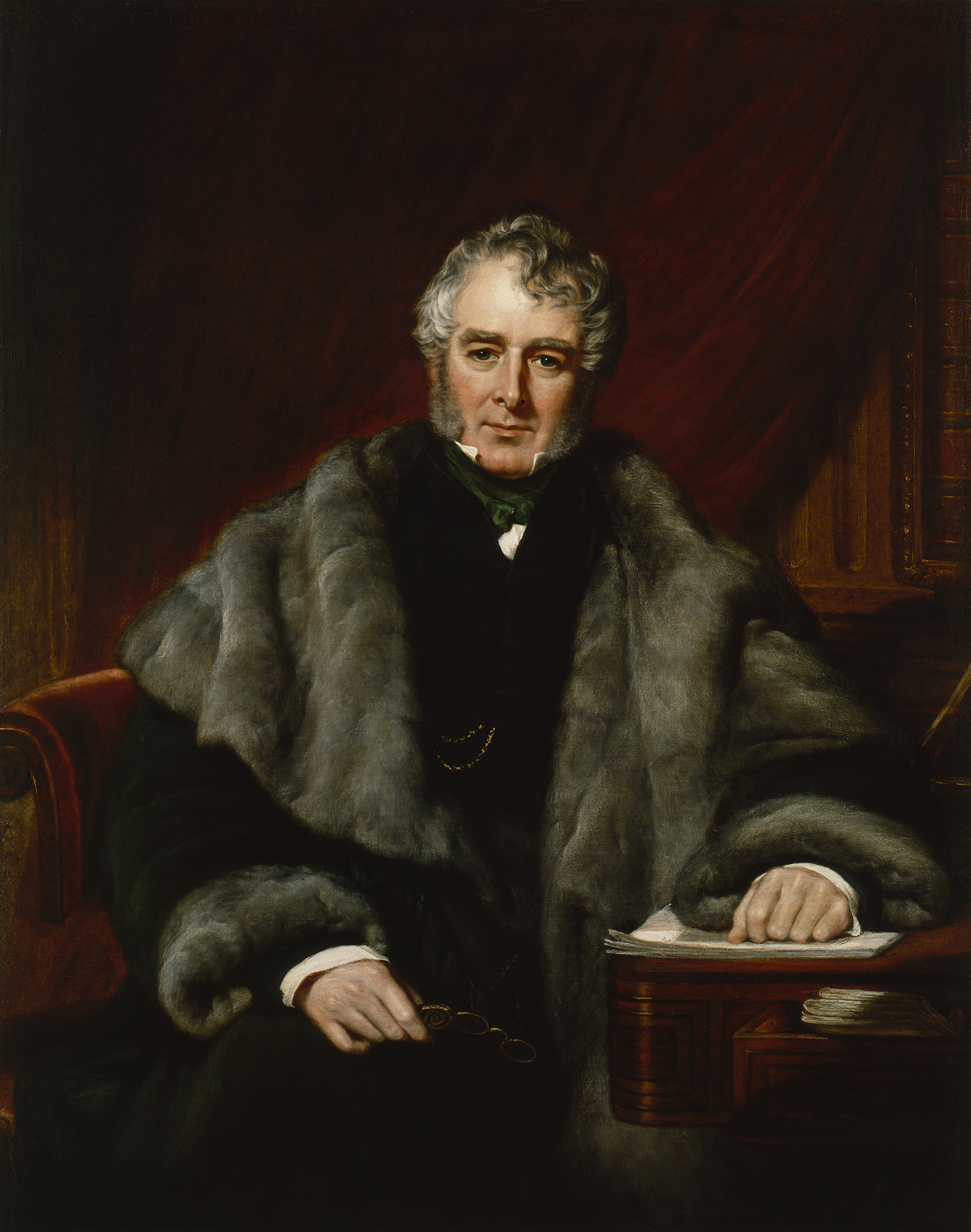
Portrait of Lord Melbourne by John Partridge.

Both Batman and Fawkner settled in the new town, which had several interim names, including Batmania, Bearbrass, Bearport, Dutergalla, Glenelg, Neramnew, and The Settlement, before being officially named Melbourne on 10 April 1837 by Governor Richard Bourke in honour of the British Prime Minister, Lord Melbourne.

Batman and his family settled at what became known as Batman's Hill, at the western end of Collins Street, an area now covered by the Spencer Street railway yards. He built a house at the base of the hill in April 1836. Batman's health quickly declined after 1835 as syphilis had disfigured and crippled him, and he became estranged from his wife, convict Elizabeth Callaghan. They had had seven daughters and a son. His son drowned in the Yarra River.

Fawkner became a local publican, running Melbourne's first hotel on the corner of William Street and Flinders Lane. He founded the Melbourne Advertiser, the city's first newspaper, in 1838. He became a major landowner at Pascoe Vale north of Melbourne. A contentious figure, he involved himself heavily in politics and in 1851 he was elected to the first Legislative Council of the Port Phillip District, and in 1856 he was elected to the first Parliament of the self-governing colony of Victoria, as MLC for Central Province. In Melbourne as in Launceston, Fawkner made many enemies, before dying as the grand old man of the colony on 4 September 1869 in Smith Street, Collingwood at the age of 77. At his government-appointed public funeral over 200 carriages were present, and 15,000 persons were reported to have lined the streets on his burial day, 8 September 1869. He was buried at the Melbourne General Cemetery. He and Eliza did not have any children.

Both Batman and Fawkner have many streets, parks and other places in Melbourne named after them. There was a federal electorate of Batman from 1906 to 2019 before being renamed to Cooper, and there was an electorate of Fawkner from 1913 to 1969. There is a suburb called Fawkner and Fawkner's estate at Pascoe Vale is now also a suburb.
