= Sarah Willoughby =

Sarah Willoughby may refer to:

- Elizabeth Callaghan (1802-1852), Irish transportee to Australia, later known as Sarah Willoughby
- Sarah Willoughby, character in 1944 film Welcome, Mr. Washington
