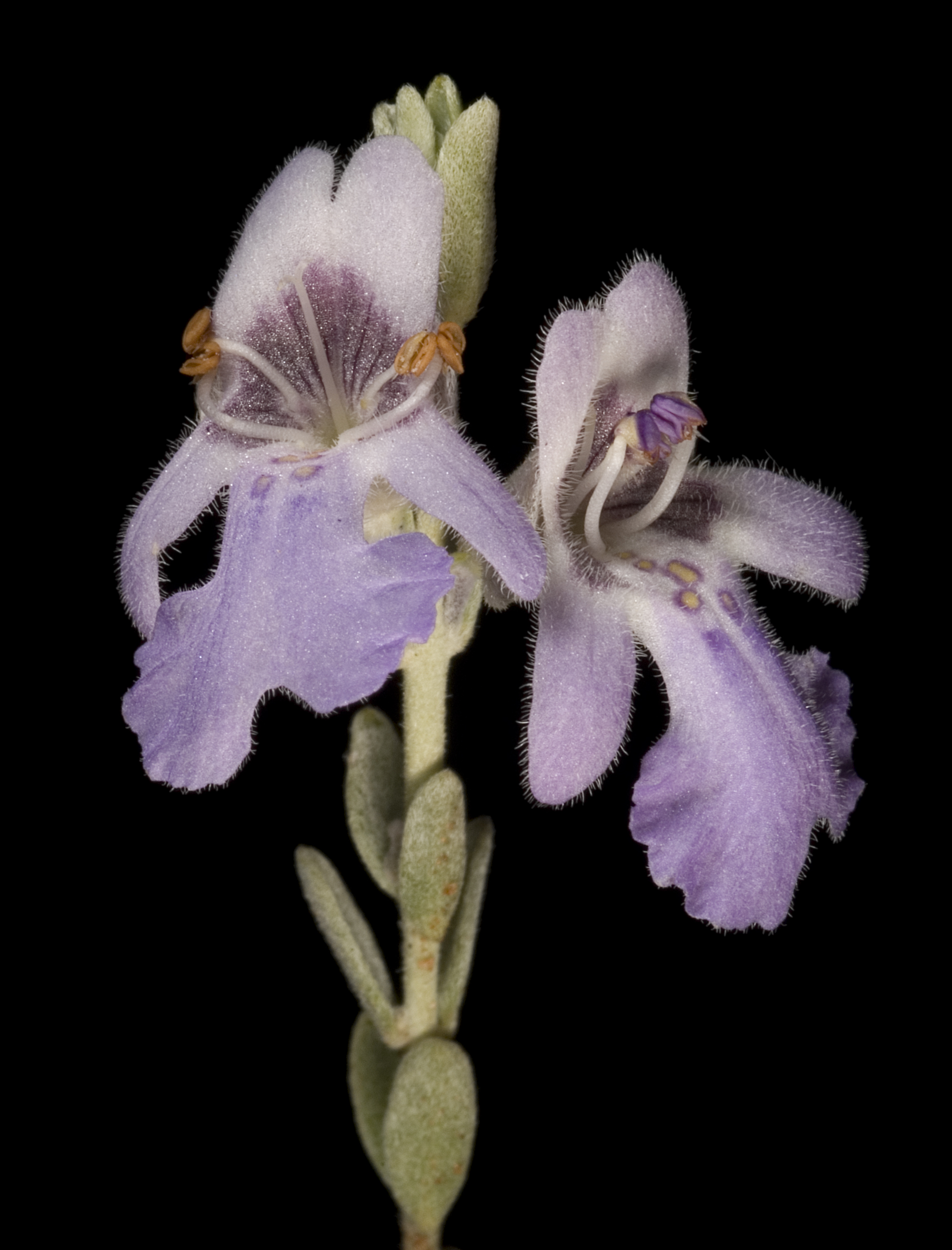

Scientific classification
- Kingdom: Plantae
- Clade: Tracheophytes
- Clade: Angiosperms
- Clade: Eudicots
- Clade: Asterids
- Order: Lamiales
- Family: Lamiaceae
- Genus: Prostanthera
- Species: P. wilkieana

Binomial name
- Prostanthera wilkieana F.Muell.
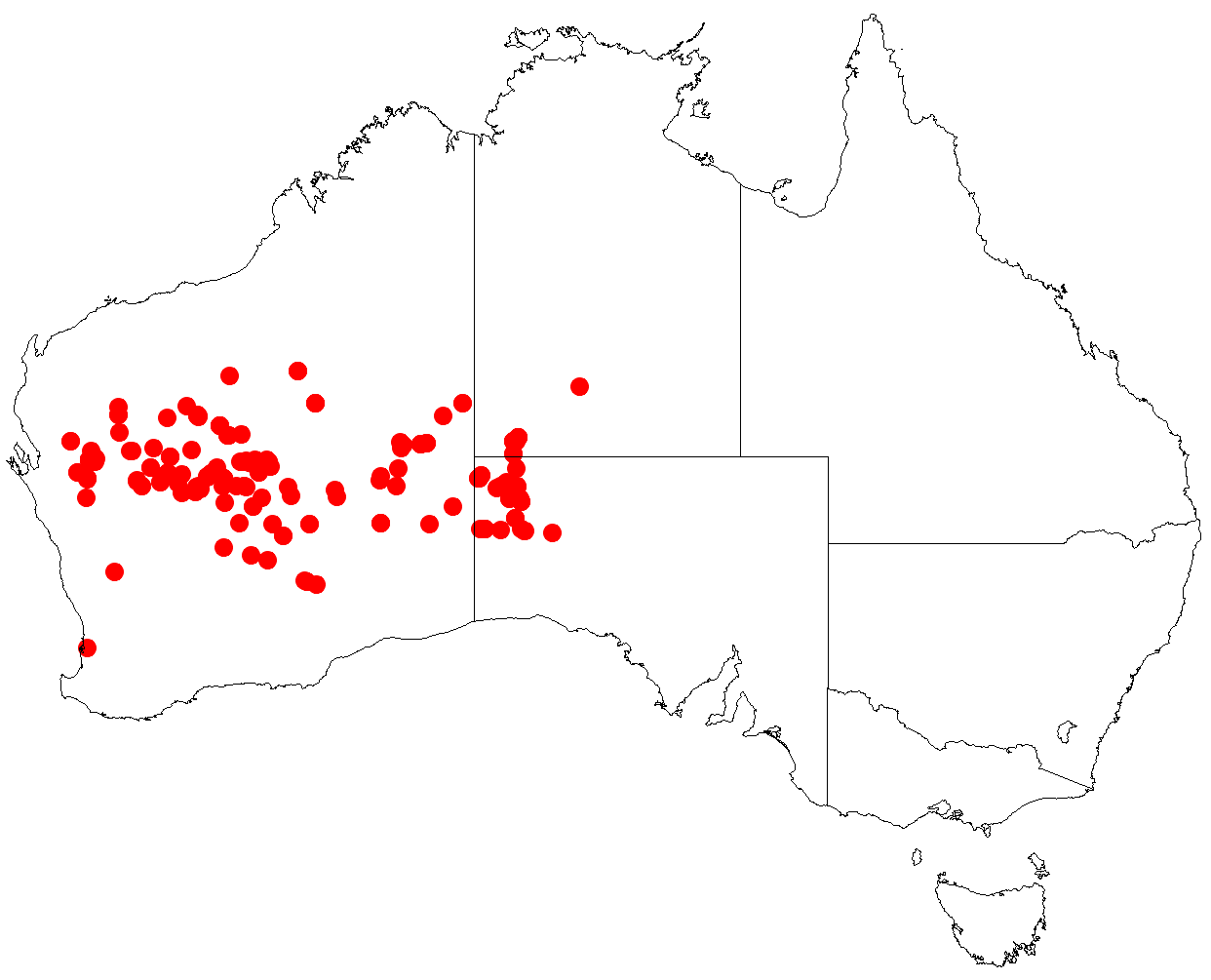
- Occurrence data from AVH

= Prostanthera wilkieana =

Species of plant

Prostanthera wilkieana is a species of flowering plant that is endemic to the more arid areas of Australia. It is an erect, densely-branched shrub with elliptic to narrow egg-shaped leaves with the narrower end towards the base and mauve to pale violet or white flowers with deep purple streaks and yellowish brown dots inside the petal tube.

== Description ==
Prostanthera wilkieana is an erect, densely-branched shrub that typically grows to a height of 0.3–1.2 m (1 ft 0 in – 3 ft 11 in) and has its branches, leaves and sepals appearing silvery to grey due to a dense covering of hairs. The leaves are elliptic to narrow egg-shaped with the narrower end towards the base, 4–10 mm (0.16–0.39 in) long, 1.5–5.5 mm (0.059–0.217 in) wide and sessile. The flowers are arranged in groups of eight to fourteen near the ends of branchlets, each flower on a pedicel 1–3.5 mm (0.039–0.138 in) long. The sepals form a tube 2.6–4.3 mm (0.10–0.17 in) long with two lobes, the lower lobe 3.6–6.5 mm (0.14–0.26 in) long and the upper lobe 2.1–4 mm (0.083–0.157 in) long. The petals are mauve to pale violet or white, 7.5–17 mm (0.30–0.67 in) long, forming a tube 3.3–7.5 mm (0.13–0.30 in) long with deep purple streaks and yellowish brown dots inside. The middle lower lobe is spatula-shaped, 3–6.5 mm (0.12–0.26 in) long and wide, the side lobes are 5.2–8.5 mm (0.20–0.33 in) long. The upper lip is 5.5–10.5 mm (0.22–0.41 in) long and 8.5–13.8 mm (0.33–0.54 in) wide with a central notch 3–4.6 mm (0.12–0.18 in) deep. Flowering occurs from July to November.

== Taxonomy and naming ==
Prostanthera wilkieana was first formally described in 1874 by Ferdinand von Mueller in Fragmenta Phytographiae Australiae from specimens collected by Ernest Giles. The specific epithet (wilkieana) honour's von Mueller's friend David Elliot Wilkie, a senator in the government of the Colony of Victoria.

== Distribution and habitat ==
This mint-bush occurs in arid areas of central Western Australia, the far south-west of the Northern Territory and the north-west of South Australia where it grows in spinifex sandplain communities.

== Conservation status ==
Prostanthera wilkieana is listed as "near threatened" by the Northern Territory Government Parks and Wildlife Commission Act but as "not threatened" in Western Australia by the Western Australian Government Department of Parks and Wildlife.
