= John Collicott =

Australian settler and auctioneer

John Thomas Collicott (23 September 1798 – 3 July 1840) was a farmer, auctioneer, postmaster of Hobart and one of the original investors in the Port Phillip Association.

Collicott was born in England and emigrated to Sydney, Australia in 1819 on board the 'Mary Anne' . He was granted 200 acres (0.81 km^{2}) of land by Governor Macquarie at Lake Illawarra which he named 'Campbell park'.

Collicott leased his land and sailed for Hobart on 23 January 1819 and there entered business variously as a storekeeper, estate agent, auctioneer and speculator. In August 1823 Collicott was on the board that established the Bank of Van Diemen's Land, holding a considerable number of shares on his death. On the 17 August 1822 he was appointed postmaster at Hobart and conducted the post office from his rooms at Murray Street. At first he received no fixed salary but retained the postal fees he collected. Lieutenant-governor George Arthur later transferred the post office to government control granting Collicott 300 pounds per year. In 1834 he was appointed as a Commissioner of the Peace and in 1838 his salary was raised to 450 pounds. He was one of the original investors of the Port Phillip Association who were a group of businessmen who sent John Batman across to Port Phillip in 1835 to purchase a vast tract of land where Melbourne now stands.

In poor health for some time, Collicott died suddenly on leave in Sydney. In recognition of his eighteen years service as postmaster the lieutenant-governor headed his funeral procession.
