= Charles Swanston =

Australian politician

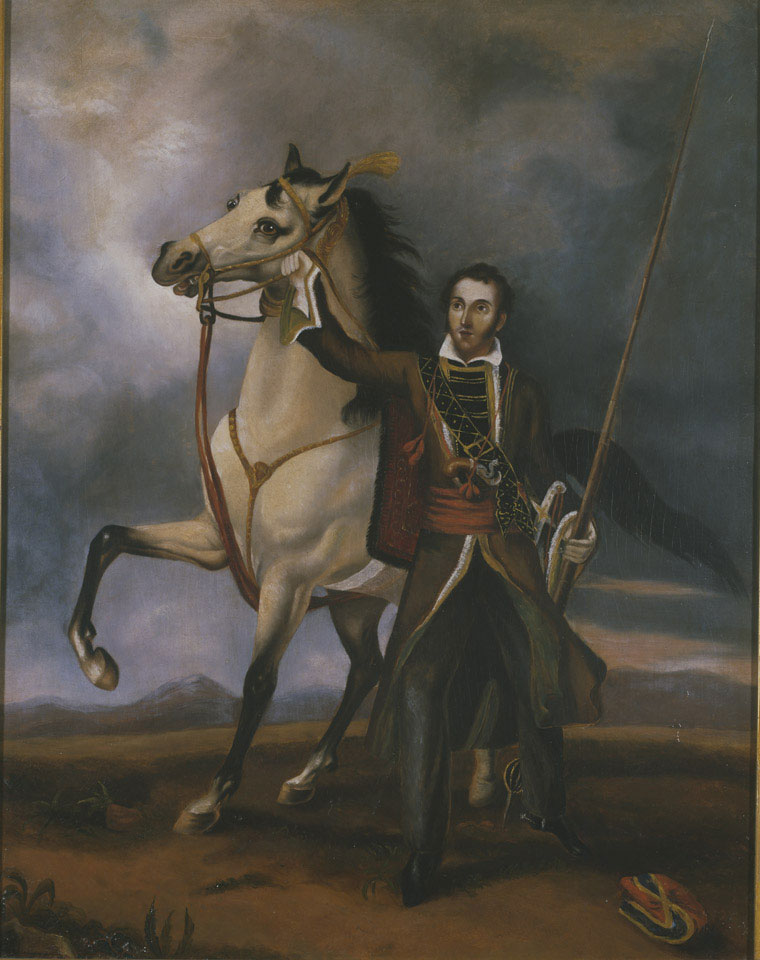
- Lt Charles Swanston (1789-1850), in the uniform of the Poona Irregular Horse, 1819
- Born: Charles Swanston; 11 December 1789; Mordington, Berwickshire, Scotland
- Died: 5 September 1850; Onboard Raven
- Resting place: Pacific Ocean
- Occupations: Merchant, banker and politician

Charles Swanston (11 December 1789 – 5 September 1850) was a British merchant, banker, and politician, and a financial backer of the Port Phillip Association.

== Early life and education ==
Charles Swanston was born in Mordington, Berwickshire, Scotland the son of Robert and Rebecca (née Lambert) Swanston. At 16, he was commissioned a lieutenant in the private army of the British East India Company.

== Career ==
=== Mauritius ===
In 1810, Swanston was a member of an expedition which obtained the political overthrow of Mauritius and was appointed to survey the island.

=== India ===
In May 1814, Swanston left England and returned to duty in India via Scutari and Baghdad, a distance of 3000 km on horseback in 48 days. In September 1817, he was ordered to raise 1000 men for the Poona Auxiliary Horse brigade and was appointed commander. In command of these troops, he was involved in several actions and was wounded three times. In the aftermath to the Battle of Koregaon in 1818, he captured Trimbakji Dengle, a Marathi leader on whose head the British had placed a price of £10,000. In January 1819, Swanston was promoted captain, but within a year lost his command because of great reductions in the army. In 1821, he was offered the position of assistant quartermaster-general of the army but declined, accepting instead the office of military paymaster in the provinces of Travancore and Tinnevelly a position he held for six years. In September 1828, he was granted a year's leave to Van Diemen's Land on account of ill health.

=== Australia ===
Swanston arrived at Hobart Town in HMS Success on 4 January 1829 with his wife Georgina (née Sherson) and their 6 children. Although on leave, he soon purchased 'Fenton Forest' an estate on the Styx River. He also bought several other properties of over 3000 acres (12 km²). He returned briefly to India in 1830 at the expiration of his leave, where he resigned his military commission and returned to Van Diemen's Land in May 1831.

In November 1831, he was appointed managing director of the Derwent Bank, which had recently been established as a partnership predominantly by supporters of the government. He was also nominated a member of the Tasmanian Legislative Council in 1832. He soon bought a controlling interest in the Derwent Bank, and under his control the enterprise prospered attracting large amounts of overseas capital for investment at high rates of interest. He was responsible for introducing the overdraft system to Australian banking in 1834, in which year he established the Derwent Savings Bank. In addition to banking, he conducted an import-export business for commodities such as tea, rum and wool. On behalf of many officers and officials in India, he invested money in Van Diemen's Land in mortgages and bank shares.

In 1835, a group of Hobart investors, including Swanston, formed the Port Phillip Association to explore and acquire land in Port Phillip District (present-day Victoria). Swanston acted as the syndicate's banker. In 1835, John Batman's expedition landed at Port Phillip and claimed to have bought 600,000 acres (2400 km²) including the future sites of Melbourne and Geelong under a document called Batman's treaty. Recognition of the title to this land was refused by the government in Sydney and London despite strenuous claims by the Association of its legality. The Port Phillip Association was granted compensation of £7,000, allowed as a reduction on the purchase price of land bought by the association in Melbourne at public auction. Most of the members of the Association sold their entitlements to Swanston. He changed the name of the Association to the Derwent Company before dissolving it in 1842.

In 1841, Swanston had converted the Derwent Bank into a mortgage bank, but as the economic depression of the 1840s deepened, the flow of overseas capital to the bank greatly diminished, the value of the land over which the bank held mortgages dropped and the price of wool fell and debtors to the bank found difficulty in meeting interest payments. He managed to keep the bank going for another five years; but was then forced to resign and the Derwent Bank went into liquidation. His personal liabilities were estimated at £104,375. He became a bankrupt and settled with his creditors at 10 shillings in the pound.

In 1844, Swanston, in partnership with his son-in-law Edward Willis, began trading as a grazier and merchant in Geelong, Victoria. They controlled several properties in western Victoria totaling over 150,000 acres (600 km²).

In 1850, he left Australia and sailed for America but stayed only briefly. Departing California to return to Australia, he died on 5 September on board "Raven" and was buried at sea.

== Legacy ==
Charles Swanston had five sons and four daughters. Laura (1813 - 1849); Charles Lambert (1821 - 1897) who took over his father's interest in Swanston & Willis in 1850 and continued to manage the properties near Geelong. Catherine (1822 - 1894) who married pastoralist Edward Willis (1816-1895). Robert Sherson (1825 - 1901) became British consul in Fiji. Twin sons William Oliver (1827 - 1908) and McDonald Kinnear (1827 - 1877). William joined the Indian Army and retired as a Major-General. With brother Charles, McDonald held a large sheep station, Otama, in the South Island of New Zealand from 1864 until 1877. Nowell (1833 - 1912), also joined the Indian army and retired as Major-General. Rebecca (1836 - 1899) and Georgiana May (abt 1838).

Swanston Street in Melbourne, Victoria is named after him.

== Sources ==
- Swanston, Charles (1967). "Swanston, Charles (1789–1850)". Australian Dictionary of Biography, Volume 2. Melbourne University Press.
