= James Simpson (civil servant) =

Australian politician

James Simpson (c. 1792 – 17 April 1857) was born in England and arrived in Van Diemen's Land (now Tasmania) in April 1825 on board the Elizabeth.

In March 1827 he was appointed police magistrate at Norfolk Plains and subsequently at Campbell Town. In 1832 he moved to Hobart to take up the position of commissioner of the Land Board. Simpson then joined the Port Phillip Association and, in February 1836, submitted his resignation to Lieutenant-governor George Arthur who reported to the Colonial Office that Simpson had "been infected with the Port Phillip mania."

Simpson moved to Melbourne in April 1836 in the barque Caledonia. On arrival, ss a member of the Port Phillip Association he took up the land he had been allocated between the Werribee River and Station Peak, but did not retain it long term.

At the first public meeting of settlers of Port Phillip, held on 1 June 1836, Simpson was given the role of arbitrator with power to resolve disputes, apart from arguments over land.

In April 1837 Simpson was officially made a magistrate by William Lonsdale and later police magistrate of Melbourne a position he held for a year.

Further official positions followed: Chairman of the market commissioners (1841), warden of the district council of Bourke (1843), temporary sub-treasurer (1846), commissioner of Crown lands (1849), sheriff (1851). Simpson was also a key figure in the business and cultural life of the Melbourne community. He was vice-president of the first savings bank, president of the Mechanics' Institute, a director of the Bank of Australasia, managing director of the Steam Navigation Company and a first trustee of St Peter's Church.

During the 1840s Simpson lived on Little Flinders Street, but moved to a new house on Wellington Street in East Melbourne. He died on 17 April 1857 of a liver abscess aged 65 and was buried in the Church of England section of the Melbourne General Cemetery.
