= William Sams =

Australian cricketer and investor

William Gardner Sams

William Gardner Sams (1792–1871) was appointed Under-Sheriff of Hobart in 1831 and later Sheriff and Commissioner of Insolvency of Launceston, Tasmania in 1840 . He was also one of fifteen investors in the pastoral company Port Phillip Association which played a key role in the foundation of the city of Melbourne.

Sams was appointed as a Page to Duke of Kent, father of Queen Victoria. He held the rank of Lieutenant and was a member of London Stock Exchange.

He immigrated to Van Diemen's Land (later Tasmania) in 1825. He received a grant of land near Westbury.

In 1838 he was a founding member of the Melbourne Cricket Club and played in their third match as a 'Batchelor' making 18 not out. He was buried in Melbourne General Cemetery.
