= Tanderrum =

Aboriginal Australian ceremony

A tanderrum is an Aboriginal Australian ceremony enacted by the nations of the Kulin people and other Aboriginal Victorian nations allowing safe passage and temporary access and use of land and resources by foreign people. It was a diplomatic rite involving the landholder's hospitality and a ritual exchange of gifts, sometimes referred to as "Freedom of the Bush".

Visiting people were presented to elders by an interim group known to all parties. Eucalypt leaves were used in the ceremony to indicate visitors were free to partake of the resources. Water was shared from a tarnuk, sipped through a reed straw, with the hosts partaking first to reassure the visitors that the water was not poisoned.

The signing of Batman's Treaty in 1835 was likely to have been interpreted as a tanderrum ceremony by the Wurundjeri and Boon wurrung peoples, according to some historians. Certainly the Wurundjeri and Boon wurrung people continued to act with hospitality to the settlers in the first years of the Foundation of Melbourne, while other Aboriginal nations engaged in resistance over dispossession of their lands.

William Thomas, the Assistant Protector of Aborigines for the Port Phillip District, described a tanderrum ceremony enacted by the Wurundjeri in 1845.

Tanderrum ceremonies are still performed today by Wurundjeri elders sometimes as part of a Welcome to Country protocol.

Indigenous Australian artist Ellen Jose has a sculpture called Tanderrum (1997) on Herring Island Environmental Sculpture Park, done in conjunction with Wurundjeri elder Joy Murphy. National Parks describe the sculpture:

Tanderrum (coming together) brings together concepts of pride, culture and spirit and the work symbolises the coming together of the Kulin nation as one people. It links the symbols and Legends of the Dreaming with ancestral bird spirits and totems of the five clan groups.
