= Elizabeth Callaghan =

British convict (1803–1852)

Elizabeth Callaghan (1802–1852; also Eliza Thompson, later Elizabeth Batman and Sarah Willoughby) was a convict born in Ireland in 1802 and shipped to the penal colony in New South Wales at the age of 17 for passing a counterfeit bank note for £1 with intent to defraud the Bank of England. She travelled with 103 other convicts on 6 June 1821 and arrived in Hobart on 7 January 1822. The town of Mount Eliza near Melbourne is named after her.

== Early life ==
Callaghan had roots in Ennis, County Clare, Ireland. She worked as a servant. It has been said that her family of origin were land owners and her grandfather of exceptional wealth. There appears to be some separation of Elizabeth’s father from her grandparents and suggestions that her father was a very unhappy man. Her mother was an elegant, learned and strong lady of exceptional character. The family struggled, and Callaghan was sent on her way at just seventeen. Beautiful, elegant, fiery and learned – her mother was confident that she would easily find her place in the world.

== Criminal record ==
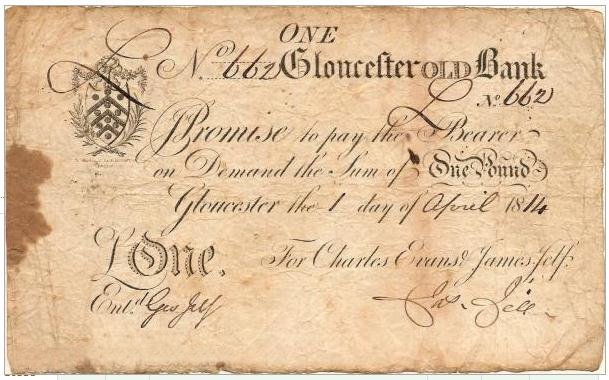
An example of an English £1 banknote (1814) (Gloucester Old Bank note for Charles Evans & James Fell)

On 13 September 1820 Callaghan was tried for "felonious disposal of and putting away a forged and counterfeit bank note for £1 with intent to defraud the Bank of England" at the Middlesex Gaol Delivery (Old Bailey), London, England. She was sentenced to 14 years (death commuted) and was transported to New South Wales, arriving on 18 December 1821.

On 27 March 1822, she committed an offence of being drunk and disorderly and was in HM Gaol for one week. She had to wear an iron collar for the period and to sit in stocks twice, two hours at each time. She committed another offence on 25 June when she was caught sneaking out of her master’s premises on the 24th and remained absent all night. She was sentenced to sit in stocks for three hours that day. In 1823, Callaghan committed an offence when she was absent from her master’s premises one day and night. She was punished for a week, with bread and water rations and had to sit in the stocks for two hours each day.

== Family ==
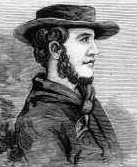
Callaghan's husband John Batman

Callaghan married John Batman on 29 March 1828 in St John's, Launceston, Tasmania.

The couple had seven daughters and a son. Their only son, John Charles Batman, died aged just 8 or 9 years old by drowning in the Yarra River on 11 January 1845.

Batman became ill around 1835, and in February 1839 Elizabeth sailed to England. He died on 6 May 1839 but she only heard of this when she returned to Australia in March 1840. His will left her only £5, which she and her second husband challenged in a lengthy but unsuccessful lawsuit.

After Batman died, Callaghan married William Willoughby, her former husband's clerk in 1841. In July 1853 her daughter, Elizabeth Mary, described her late mother as "Elizabeth Callan, governess".

== Death and legacy ==
Callaghan was murdered in 1852 in Geelong, being beaten and kicked to death in a bar-room brawl. At this time she was known as Sara Willoughby and had been described as "of somewhat abandoned character".
