= Schooner Rebecca =

Rebecca
History
- Builder: George Plummer
- Launched: 1834
- Fate: Wrecked 20 March 1839

General characteristics
- Tonnage: 30 tons
- Length: 35 ft 4 in (10.77 m)
- Beam: 13 ft 1 in (3.99 m)
- Draft: 6 ft (1.8 m)

The 30-ton sloop Rebecca was launched in 1834, built by Captain George Plummer at his boatyard on the banks of the Tamar River at Rosevears, Van Diemen's Land (Tasmania).

In 1835, it was owned by Robert Scott and chartered by John Batman on behalf of the Port Phillip Association for his first voyage to Port Phillip. Sailing from Launceston, Tasmania on 10 May 1835, under the charge of Captain A. B. Harwood, he landed in Port Phillip Bay on 29 May 1835, where, later on 6 June 1835, he entered into a treaty with the aboriginal people for use of their land and chose the site of the future city of Melbourne, known as the Batman Treaty

After leaving a small party at Indented Head, Batman returned to Launceston, Tasmania on Rebecca and announced his treaty to the colony at large. John Helder Wedge, who was also a member of the Port Phillip Association, then sailed to Port Phillip on Rebecca to explore the country, landing at Indented Head and then sailing up the Yarra River, which he named.

Horton and Morris, authors of "The Andersons of Westernport", believe Samuel Anderson, pioneer of Western Port, purchased Rebecca at auction on 19 October 1835 at Kings Wharf for the use of the partnership of Anderson and Massie who operated from Bass in Victoria after Samuel Anderson established the third permanent settlement in Victoria in 1835.

From Tasmanian Shipwrecks
Rebecca. Sloop, 25 tons. Built and reg. at Launceston, 4/1834, 1/1840. Lbd 35-4 x 13-1 × 6 ft. She had achieved fame as the vessel which had taken John Batman to Port Phillip in 1835 to establish the 'village' of Melbourne. Captain Henry Rowland. Ashore in a gale at Cape Portland, Tasmania, 20 March 1839. All hands landed safely and salvaged the cargo, but the vessel became a total wreck. [TS1]

A memorial to Rebecca was unveiled in 1954 still existing today, near the site of George Plummer's boatyard at Rosevears, on the Tamar River, Tasmania, recording its role in the founding of Melbourne.
