= Port Phillip Association =

Colonial company involved in the establishment of Melbourne

The Port Phillip Association (originally the Geelong and Dutigalla Association) was formally formed in June 1835 to settle land in what would become Melbourne, which the association believed had been acquired by John Batman for the association from Wurundjeri elders after he had obtained their marks to a document, which came to be known as Batman's Treaty.

The leading members of the association were John Batman, a farmer, Joseph Gellibrand, a lawyer and former Attorney-General, Charles Swanston, banker and member of the Legislative Council, John Helder Wedge, surveyor and farmer, Henry Arthur, nephew of Lieutenant Governor George Arthur of Van Diemen’s Land, and various others including William Sams, Under Sheriff and Public Notary for Launceston, Anthony Cottrell, Superintendent of Roads and Bridges, John Collicott, Postmaster General, James Simpson, Commissioner of the Land Board and police magistrate, John Sinclair, Superintendent of Convicts, Michael Connolly, Thomas Bannister, George Mercer, and John and William Robertson.

== Objective ==
Some fifteen of the leading colonists of Tasmania (at the time called Van Diemen's Land), plus the Edinburgh-based Mercer, formed a company in early 1835 with a view to purchasing a large tract of land from the Aboriginal peoples who lived on the south coast of Australia, and to there establish a settlement. Gellibrand prepared deeds for the transfer of an interest in the land and which provided for the payment of an annual tribute. John Batman took copies of the deed with him when he went into Port Phillip in May 1835, accompanied by some servants and Aboriginals from New South Wales.

== Batman's treaty ==
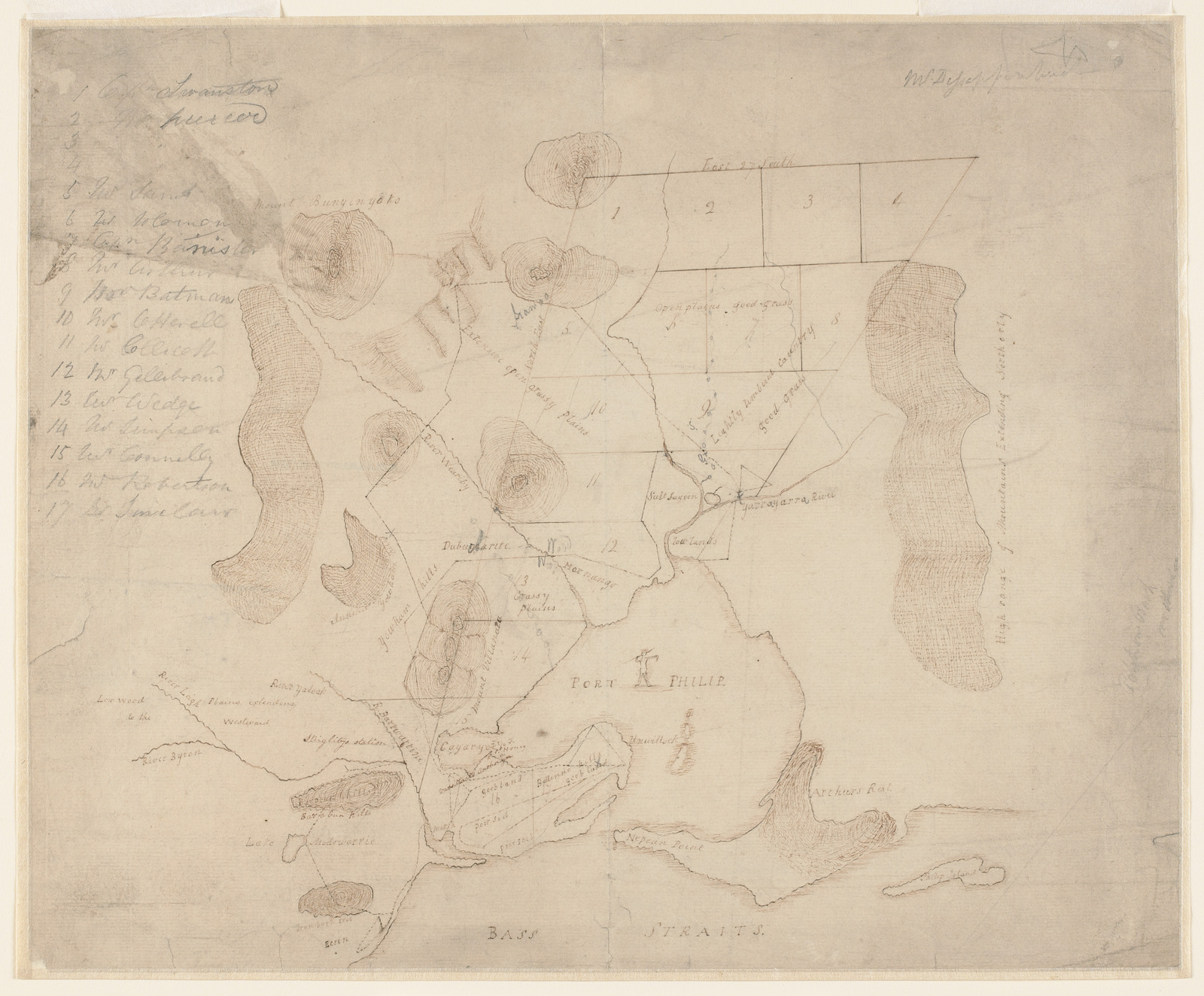
John Helder Wedge's map of John Batman's exploration of the Port Phillip District, drawn in 1835. This map shows the proposed subdivision of the lands amongst the Port Phillip Association members.

Batman sailed from Launceston in the schooner Rebecca on 10 May 1835 and landed at Indented Head on the Bellarine Peninsula in Port Phillip Bay on 29 May 1835. Between 29 May and 10 June, Batman claimed to have explored an area, including; the Bellarine Peninsula, the eastern part of the Surf Coast, the coastal areas of Geelong to Port Melbourne, northeast from Geelong to either 'Mount Iramoo' near Sunbury or Mount Koroit north east of Melton, and easterly (his journal suggests he made it only to either Merri Creek or Edgars Creek near Fawkner, or perhaps the Darebin River or Plenty River, but the subsequent maps by Wedge suggest a far greater easterly point), and southwest to Melbourne and Port Melbourne. Batman's journal lists 6 June as the day he encountered Kulin Nations peoples and their leaders. Batman claimed a ceremony was held where he proclaimed the treaty and then exchanged his party's gifts in return for the land he explored.

Batman's first exploration of the Yarra River occurred on 8 June, where he claimed to sail a boat up the river and found a pleasant spot with deep water about 6 miles inland. He stated in his diary "this will be the place for a village", the village which eventually became known as Melbourne. After leaving some men to build a hut and start a garden at Indented Head, Batman and the Rebecca returned to Van Diemen’s Land. Here Batman showed Wedge where he had explored and, from these details, Wedge prepared the first map of Melbourne in June 1835 (published in 1836), showing the location Batman had chosen as the site for the "village" and the division of land between association members.

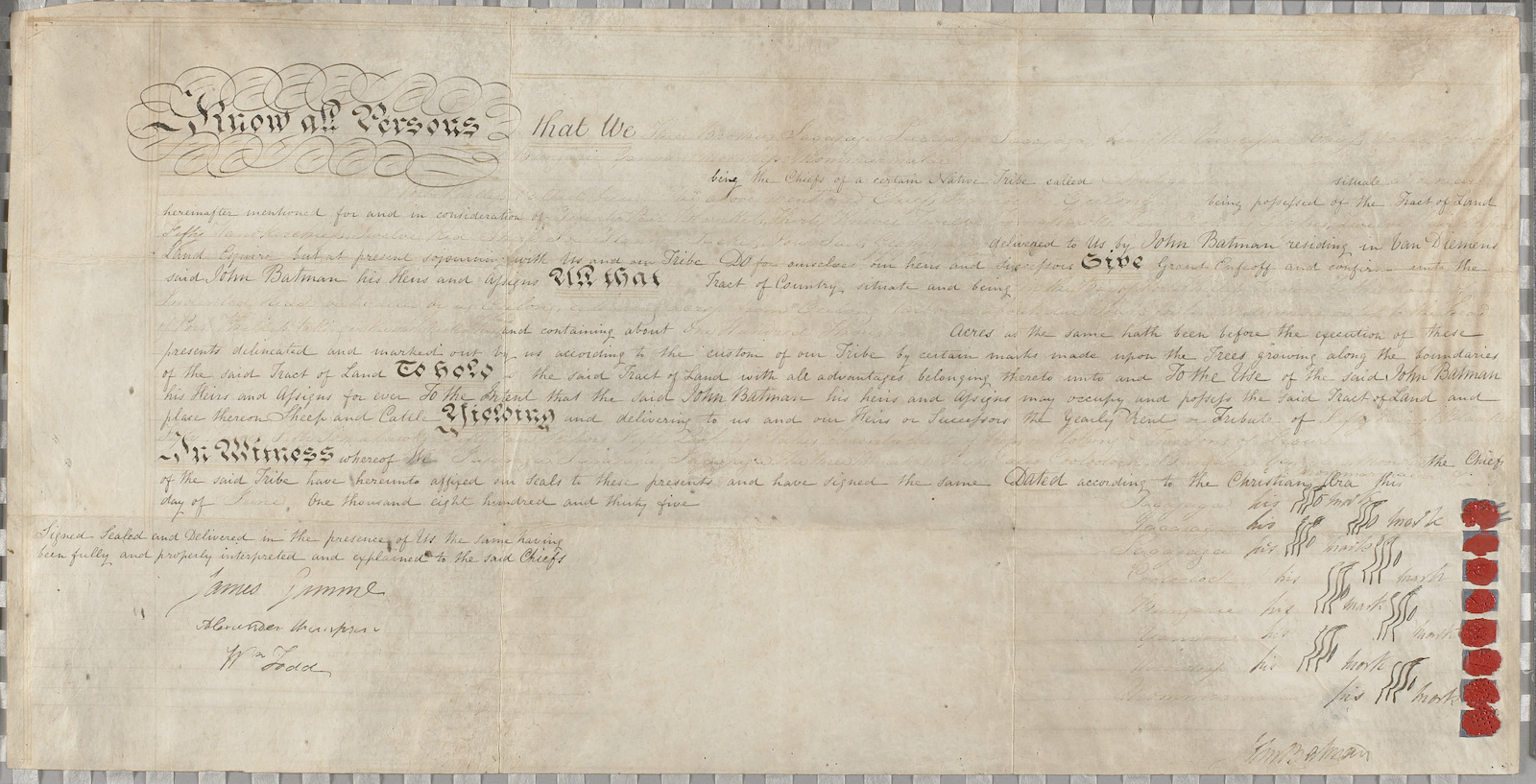
The Batman treaty for the area of Geelong, signed and dated 6 June 1835.

Batman’s treaty with the Aboriginal peoples of Port Phillip is the only example of any Australian settlers (official or unofficial) giving recognition to the rights of the Aboriginal peoples to the land. The members of the Port Phillip Association did not intend the treaty to be a fair commercial transaction, but a means of obtaining permission from the Aboriginal peoples to avoid resentment (and subsequent violence) after settlement, whilst convincing the colonial and imperial authorities that they should be allowed to settle the land. The association knew that existing British policy (the Nineteen Counties Order) was designed to prevent such settlement, but hoped to challenge the authority of the New South Wales government, who held jurisdiction of the Port Phillip area.

For some time Batman's Treaty, as it came to be called, was assumed by some historians to be a forgery, but the recollections of the Aboriginal elder Barak, who was present at the signing of the treaty as a boy, established that Batman, with the aid of his New South Wales Aboriginal peoples, did in fact participate in a ceremony with Wurundjeri elders for permission to settle amongst them. In Aboriginal culture, this ceremony was called a tanderem.

According to Batman’s petition to the Lieutenant Governor of Van Diemen's Land George Arthur, he and Wedge would proceed immediately to the district with stock, and only married servants (with their wives) would be allowed to accompany them.

== Proclamation ==
On 26 August the Governor of New South Wales, Sir Richard Bourke issued a proclamation that effectively voided Batman's treaty, whatever its merits, as the British government did not recognise Aboriginal title to the land. This in effect made any potential settlers trespassers, although the governor recognised the need for further action and recommended the establishment of a township and land sales. Batman and the Rebecca had already sailed on the return journey, but spent several weeks at a temporary site at Indented Head. When they returned to the Yarra River site on 2 September, they found the area already occupied by an independent expedition financed by a Launceston businessman, John Pascoe Fawkner, which had landed on 30 August. The two groups eventually agreed to cooperate in distributing the land in the area, but the sequence of events would provide room for future debate over the credit for Melbourne's founding.

== Unlawful occupation ==
While the government in London was deciding what steps it should take in relation to the unlawful occupation of this remote and unsettled part of the existing colony of New South Wales, other settlers from Van Diemen’s Land followed suit, and soon Port Phillip became inundated with stock, squatters and servants, including escaped convicts. Conflict with the local Aboriginal peoples followed. Governor Bourke was authorised to establish a settlement in April 1836, and the town of Melbourne was surveyed and laid out in 1837.

== Sale and dissolution ==
The claims of the Port Phillip Association were only recognised to the extent of £7,000, allowed as a reduction on the purchase price of land bought by the association at public auction on 14 February 1839. Most of the members sold out to Charles Swanston, and the name was changed to the Derwent Company before being dissolved in 1842. The obligations under Batman’s treaty to feed and clothe the Aboriginal peoples were assumed by the New South Wales colonial government, although proper protection was not afforded, especially in the remote parts of the colony.

== See also ==
- History of Melbourne
