= Batman's Treaty =

1835 treaty between John Batman and Aboriginal Australians

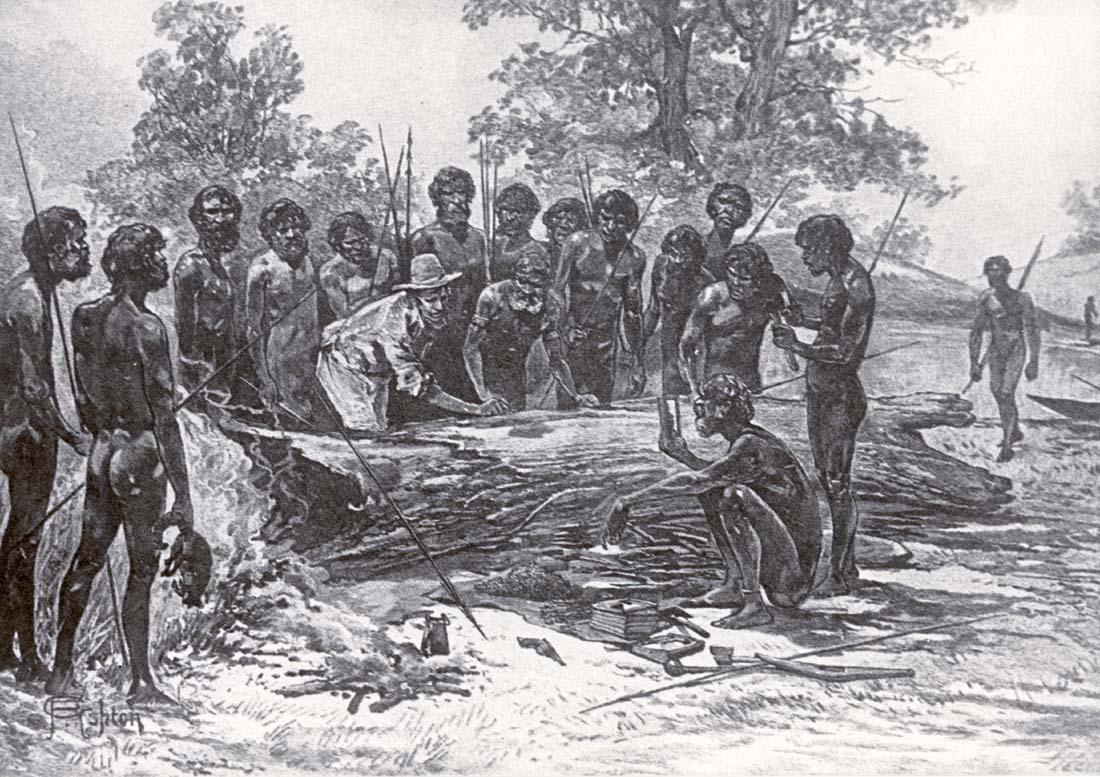
Artist's impression from the 1880s of the treaty being signed

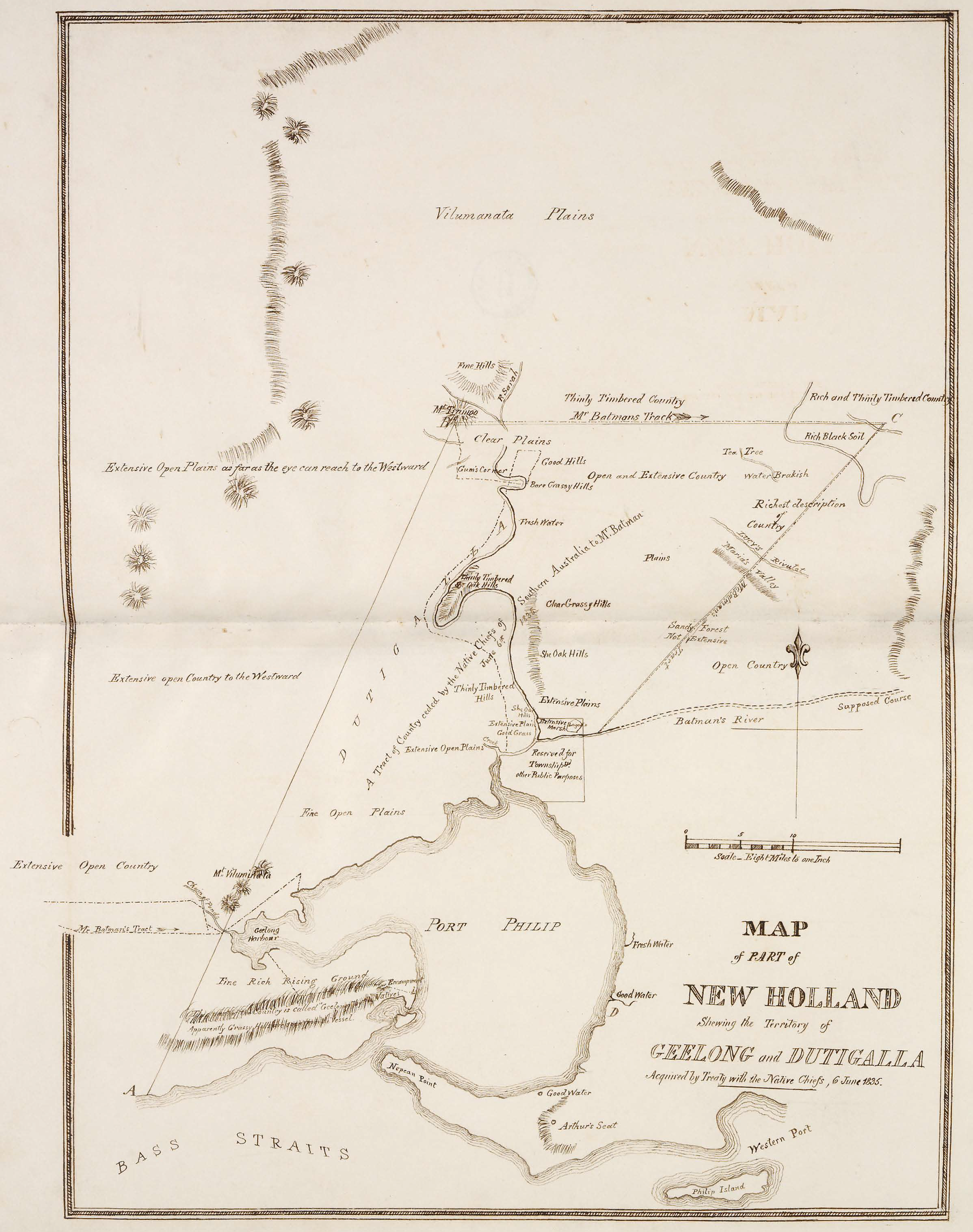
1835 map showing the area of Port Phillip, stating that this is the land "Acquired by Treaty with the Native Chiefs, 6 June 1835"

Batman's Treaty was an agreement between the Port Phillip Association of British grazier colonists (represented by John Batman), and a group of Wurundjeri and Boonwurrung elders, for the purchase of land around Port Phillip, near the present site of Melbourne. The document came to be known as Batman's Treaty and is considered significant as it was the first and only documented time when Europeans negotiated their presence and occupation of Aboriginal lands directly with the traditional owners. The treaty was implicitly declared void on 26 August 1835 by the Governor of New South Wales, Richard Bourke.

== Making of the treaty ==
In 1827, John Batman and Joseph Gellibrand, applied for a grant of land at Port Phillip, which was at the time part of the colony of New South Wales. The petitioners stated that they were prepared to bring with them sheep and cattle to the value of £4000 to £5000. The application was refused, as consistent with the Nineteen Counties Order.

By 1835, the Port Phillip Association, which was a company of British agricultural colonists mostly based in Van Diemen's Land, arranged for Batman to sail to Port Phillip to explore the area with a view to negotiate with local Aboriginal people in trading away their land. Gellibrand, a lawyer, prepared a draft deed for Batman to take on his trip, in case he found an opportunity to use it. The deed was for a transfer of an interest in land and provided for the payment of an annual tribute.

On 10 May 1835 Batman sailed the 23-ton schooner Rebecca from Launceston for the mainland. The expedition included master Harwood, mate Robert Robson, three seamen, seven Aboriginal men from New South Wales and three other white men, James Gumm, William Todd and Alexander Thomson. The party finally sailed into Port Phillip on 29 May 1835 after being delayed by bad weather. On hearing a native dog howling, they landed at Indented Head to investigate. After letting his own dogs play with the native dog, they drove it into the sea and shot it. Over the next week, they explored the area around the Bay, first at Corio Bay, near the present site of Geelong, and later moving up the Yarra and Maribyrnong rivers at the north of the Bay.

Batman's party met with Aboriginal people several times, presenting gifts of blankets, handkerchiefs, sugar, apples and other items, and receiving gifts of woven baskets and spears in exchange. On 6 June, Batman met with eight elders of the Boonwurrung and Wurundjeri, including Ngurungaetas Bebejan and three brothers with the same name, Jika Jika or Billibellary, the traditional owners of the lands around the Yarra River.

For 600,000 acres of Melbourne, including most of the land now within the suburban area, Batman paid 40 pairs of blankets, 42 tomahawks, 130 knives, 62 pairs of scissors, 40 looking glasses, 250 handkerchiefs, 18 shirts, 4 flannel jackets, 4 suits of clothes and 150 lb. of flour.

== Location of treaty signing ==
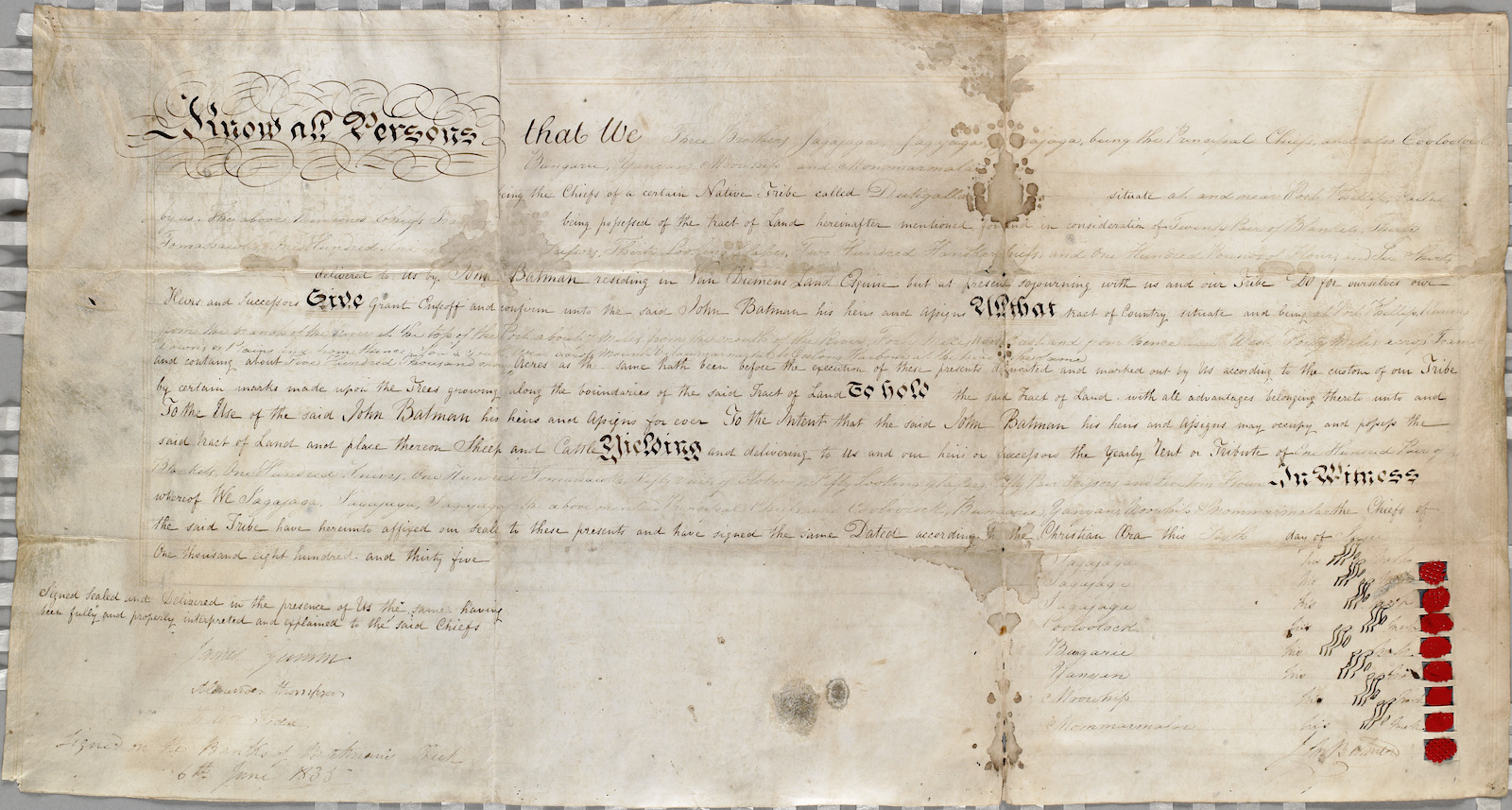
The "Melbourne" deed John Batman is said to have presented to the Kulin nations' leaders and to have it signed by them on 6 June 1835. This was intended to be evidence for Batman to claim, on behalf of the Port Phillip Association, much of the land around Port Phillip Bay.

The meeting with the Aboriginal elders took place on the bank of a small stream, which Batman described in his diary as a "lovely stream of water". Although the precise waterway and location is not given, 20th century historians suspect a likely location to have been Merri Creek, in what is currently Northcote. Alternative locations have been suggested on the Plenty River near Greensborough, Edgars Creek, and on Darebin Creek. These were generally based on analysis of the description of the journey given in the diary. However, there have been some suggestions that the critical period in the diaries was manipulated to allow for a larger tract of country to be obtained.

Harcourt identifies the treaty signing location as "West Bend", a bend in the Merri Creek at the western end of Cunningham Street, Northcote and opposite Rushall Station. 37.782472°S 144.992288°E. He relies on a range of evidence including oral traditions, the description of the signing location in John Pascoe Fawkner's accounts, previous commemorative markers and ceremonies, interpretation of landmarks in contemporary descriptions, and later depictions such as Burtt's painting of the event, which may have been prepared following discussions with participants in Batman's expedition. In 2004, a 45 square centimetre concrete block was found during works by the City of Darebin which now incorporates Northcote; the top of the white painted block has four upright steel bolts and a coating of glue, which indicate that it had been used as the base for a plaque.

The Yan Yean Reservoir was named after the Aboriginal leader who signed Batman's Treaty in 1835 with the name "Yan Yan" ("young male").

== Return to Tasmania ==
On 8 June, he wrote in his journal: "So the boat went up the large river ... and ... I am glad to state about six miles up found the River all good water and very deep. This will be the place for a village." The last sentence later became famous as the "founding charter" of Melbourne, and named the land "Batmania".

After leaving eight of the men, three of whom were white, at Indented Head with three months supply and told to build a hut and start a garden, Batman and the Rebecca returned to Launceston on 14 June. Here Batman showed John Helder Wedge where he had explored and, from these details, Wedge prepared the first map of Melbourne (published in 1836), showing the location Batman had chosen as the site for the "village" and the division of land between association members.

Several days after his return Batman wrote to the Governor of Tasmania, George Arthur, informing him of the treaty and of the Association's plans to run 20,000 sheep on the lands purchased. According to Batman's petition to George Arthur, Batman and Wedge would proceed immediately to the district with stock and only married servants (with their wives) would be allowed to accompany them. Arthur was not pleased with the Association's actions and wrote to the Governor of New South Wales, Richard Bourke.

Wedge left Launceston on 7 August 1835, to set up a settlement on the Association's new lands. After stopping at the Barwon River, Wedge moved on to the Yarra River, where he encountered a party sent by John Pascoe Fawkner. (Fawkner himself arrived only in October.) Wedge told Fawkner of the treaty, but Fawkner would not leave, dismissing the treaty as worthless.

== Disputes over the treaty ==
On 26 August 1835, Governor Bourke issued a Proclamation which formally declared that agreements such as Batman's Treaty were "void and of no effect as against the rights of the Crown" and declared any person on "vacant land of the Crown" without authorisation from the Crown to be trespassing. The proclamation was approved by the Colonial Office on 10 October 1835. The official objection to the treaty was that Batman had attempted to negotiate directly with the Aboriginal people, whom British colonists did not recognise as having any claim to any lands in Australia. Also, Batman had purchased the lands for the Association, and not for the Crown.

The validity of the treaty has been widely disputed. It is possible that the marks which Batman claimed were the signatures of the eight Wurundjeri elders were instead made by one of the five Aboriginal men he had brought with him from Parramatta, since they resemble marks commonly used by Aboriginal people from that area. Furthermore, since neither Batman, the Sydney Aboriginal men or the Wurundjeri men spoke anything approaching the same language, it is almost certain that the elders did not understand the treaty, instead probably perceiving it as part of the series of gift exchanges which had taken place over the previous few days amounting to a tanderrum ceremony which allows temporary access to and use of the land. In any case, the European system of understanding property was entirely alien to almost all Aboriginal peoples. Nevertheless, the treaty has been praised as the only documented attempt to reach an agreement for land use between white colonists and the local Aboriginal people. The treaty is significant more broadly as it is the first and only documented time when Europeans in Australia have negotiated their presence with Aboriginals. Batman maintained until his death in 1839 that the treaty was valid.

Some historians continued to assume that the treaty was a forgery, however Aboriginal elder Barak, who was present at the signing of the treaty as a boy, states that Batman, with the aid of New South Wales Aboriginal peoples, did in fact participate in a signing ceremony.

== See also ==
- Meusebach–Comanche Treaty
