= John Batman =

Australian explorer (1801–1839)

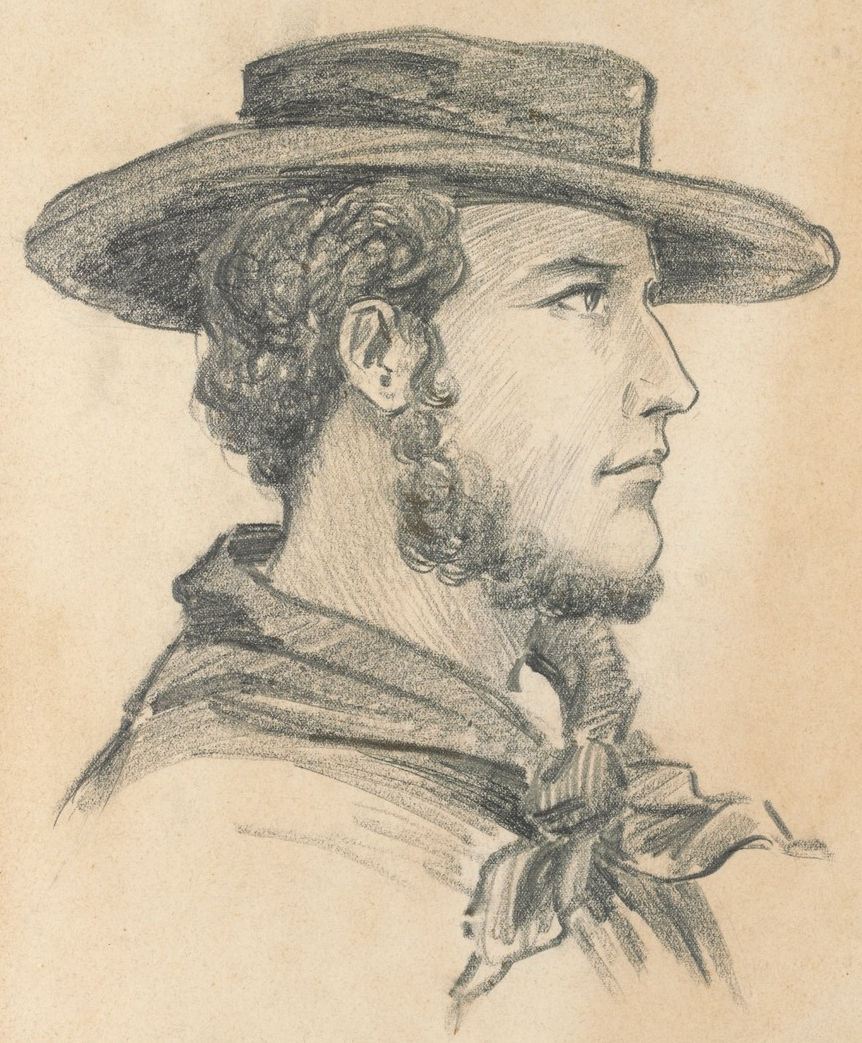
- Early-20th-century drawing of Batman, based on an earlier engraving
- Born: 21 January 1801; Rosehill, Colony of New South Wales
- Died: 6 May 1839 (aged 38); Melbourne, Colony of New South Wales
- Burial place: Old Melbourne Cemetery
- Occupations: Grazier, entrepreneur, colonial founder
- Spouse: Elizabeth Callaghan
- Children: 8

John Batman (21 January 1801 – 6 May 1839) was an Australian grazier, entrepreneur and explorer, who had a prominent role in the founding of Melbourne. He was also involved in many attacks against Aboriginal Australians.

Born and raised in the then-British colony of New South Wales, Batman settled in Van Diemen's Land (modern-day Tasmania) in the 1820s, where he rose to prominence for hunting bushrangers and leading massacres of Aboriginal people in the Black War.

He later co-founded the Port Phillip Association and led an expedition which explored the Port Phillip area on the Australian mainland with the goal of establishing a new settlement. In 1835, Batman negotiated a treaty with Aboriginal people in Port Phillip by offering them tools, blankets and food in exchange for thousands of hectares of land. However, the treaty was declared void by the government and it has been disputed by Aboriginal descendants. This expedition ultimately resulted in the founding of Melbourne, eventual capital of Victoria and one of Australia's largest and most important cities. Batman moved to the colony with his convict wife, Elizabeth Callaghan, and their seven daughters, settling on what is now known as Batman's Hill. He died of syphilis shortly afterwards at the age of 38.

Batman's treaty stands as the only colonial-era attempt by a European to engage Australian Aboriginal people in a treaty or transaction rather than simply claiming land outright. However, Batman's motives and the validity of the treaty remain of great historical interest and debate.

== Early life ==
John Batman was born on 21 January 1801 in Parramatta, Colony of New South Wales. His parents, William and Mary Bat(e)man, arrived at Sydney aboard Ganges on 2 June 1797. William was sentenced to fourteen years' transportation the previous year for receiving stolen saltpetre, while his wife paid her fare to accompany him, bringing along their children Maria and Robert.

William obtained his ticket of leave and started a timber-yard at Parramatta, where his five sons and daughter were raised. His sentence expired in 1810 and William later became a devout Wesleyan; his children were trained as Anglican-Methodists. As Aboriginals were encouraged to come into Parramatta for charity and education, John knew many Aboriginals. John was apprenticed as a blacksmith in Sydney in 1816.

== Move to Tasmania ==
In December 1821, John and his younger brother Henry journeyed to Van Diemen's Land (now known as Tasmania) to settle on land in the north-east, near Ben Lomond, to become a grazier. He acquired "Kingston", a property said to be "...large in acreage and poor agriculturally,...".

In early 1826 Batman captured the bushranger Matthew Brady, resulting in an additional grant of land by the government. Brady had been wounded in the leg in a conflict with the authorities, but got away safely. Batman went out unarmed on his own in search of Brady, and found him quite accidentally. He saw a man limping in the bush near a shallow creek, and hastened forward to him. It was Brady. He induced Brady to surrender and return with him. The outlaw was ill and suffering much pain, and did as he was asked. Brady was duly handed over to authorities at Launceston Gaol and later sentenced to death. He was hanged at Hobart.

== Participation in massacres of Aboriginal people and the Black War ==
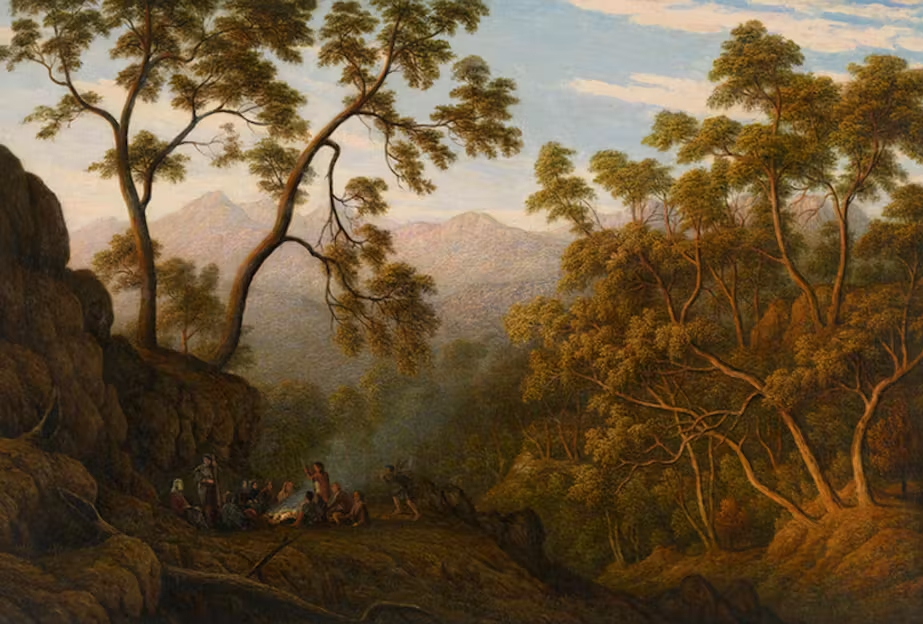
John Glover's painting Batman's Lookout, Benn Lomond (c. 1840). A neighbour and fierce critic of Batman, Glover based the title of the painting on Batman's "frequenting this spot to entrap the Natives."

Batman participated in the many killings of Tasmanian Aboriginal people while in Tasmania. Many such killings are well documented in the Tasmanian State archives and Victorian State library records.

Batman participated in the capture of some Aboriginal people in 1829. He employed mainland Aboriginal people hired in Sydney, New South Wales, for 'roving parties' hunting Tasmanian Aboriginal peoples. Between 1828 and 1830 Aboriginal people in this region were shot or rounded up by bounty hunters like Batman.

As Tasmanian Colonial Governor, George Arthur, observed, Batman "...had much slaughter to account for". Closer examination of this quote from Governor Arthur reveals a more complex picture of Batman's motives and actions on behalf of the government in these so-called "roving parties". For example, in September 1829 Batman (aged 28), with the assistance of several "Sydney blacks" he brought to Tasmania, led an attack on an Aboriginal family group together numbering 60 to 70 men, women and children in the Ben Lomond district of north-east Tasmania. Waiting until 11pm that night before attacking, he "...ordered the men to fire upon them..." as their 40-odd dogs raised the alarm and the Aboriginal people ran away into thick scrub. In his report of the incident to the police magistrate at Oatlands, Batman estimated that they killed 15 Aboriginal people. The next morning, he left the place for his farm, with two badly wounded Tasmanian men, a woman and her two-year-old son, all of whom he captured. However, he "...found it impossible that the two former [the men] could walk, and after trying them by every means in my power, for some time, found I could not get them on I was obliged to shoot them." The captured woman, named Luggenemenener, was later sent to Campbell Town gaol and separated from her two-year-old son, Rolepana, "...whom she had faced death to protect." Batman reported afterwards to British Colonial Secretary, John Burnett, in a letter of 7 September 1829, that he kept the child because he wanted "...to rear it...". Luggenemenener died on 21 March 1837 as an inmate at the Flinders Island settlement.

Later, Rolepana (aged 8 years), traveled with him as part of the founding party of Melbourne in 1835. After Batman's death in 1839, Rolepana would have been 12 years old. Boyce notes that Rolepana was employed by colonist George Ware at 12 pounds a year with board on Batman's death, "...but what became of him after this is also unknown." However, Haebich records Rolepana as having died in Melbourne in 1842 (he would have been about 15 years). She also says that:

Batman openly defied Governor Arthur and [George Augustus] Robinson by refusing to hand over two Aboriginal boys in his employ: Rolepana (or Benny Ben Lomond) and Lurnerminer (John or Jack Allen), captured by Batman in 1828. He claimed the boys were there with the consent of their parents,....He also demonstrated a strong proprietorial interest in the boys, when he told Robinson they were 'as much his property as his farm and that he had as much right to keep them as the government'. Indeed Batman was convinced that the best plan was to leave the children with the colonists, who clothed and fed them at no expense to the government and raised them to become 'useful members of society'. In a series of letters to Governor Arthur, he 'pleaded hard for the retention of youths educated by settlers and devoted to their service'.

Batman rose to prominence during the time of the Black War of 1830 (aged 29), during which he participated in the Black Line—the formation of a "human chain" across the island to drive Aboriginal people from their lands into a 'manageable' area.

In February 1830, Batman wrote to the British Colonial Secretary, John Burnett, about his difficulty in 'coming up' with [i.e., capturing] the Aboriginal people. In the same letter, he asked in explaining his difficulty in capturing Aboriginal people in the bush, "...if he could follow known [Aboriginal] offenders once they had made it 'to their own ground'.

The 19th-century artist, John Glover, captioned one of his Tasmanian paintings Batman's Lookout, Benn Lomond (c. 1840) "...on account of Mr Batman frequenting this spot to entrap the Natives." Batman's neighbour in Van Diemen's Land, Glover said that he was "a rogue, thief, cheat and liar, a murderer of blacks and the vilest man I have ever known".

Batman was diagnosed with syphilis in 1833.

By 1835, Batman's property, "...Kingston [near Ben Lomond], covered more than 7,000 acres (2,800 ha), had appropriate animals and buildings, and numerous hands; but it was too rugged to be highly productive."

== Foundation of Melbourne and Batman's Treaty ==
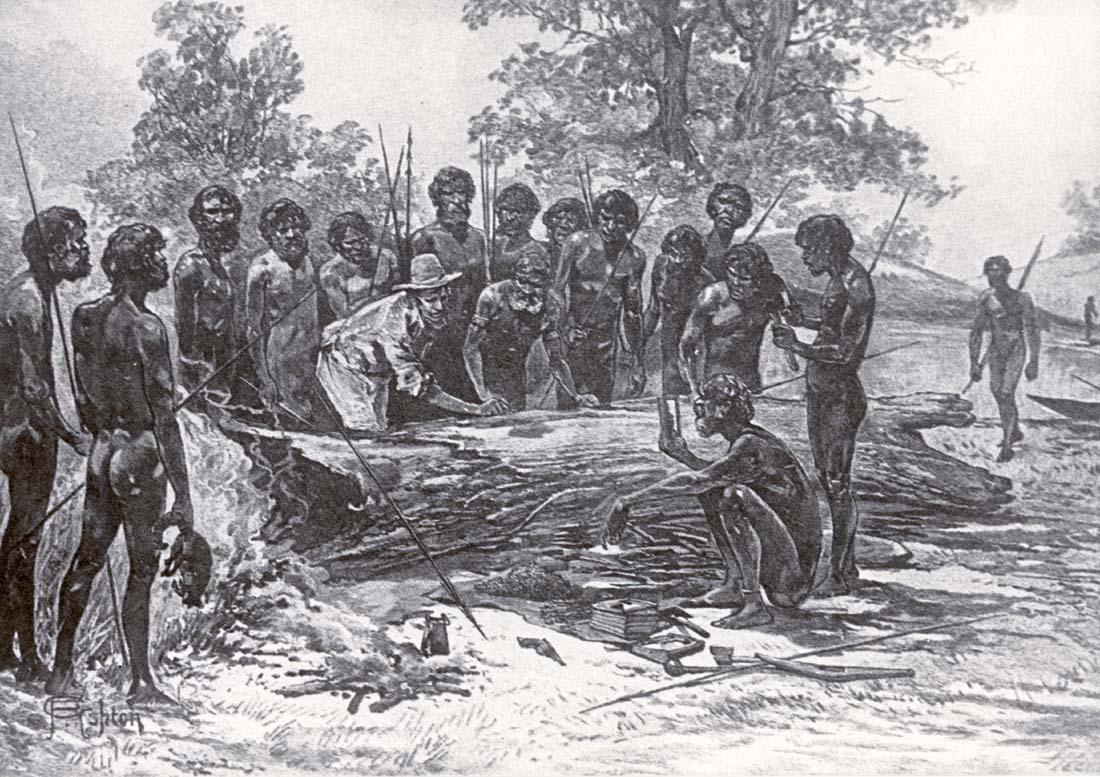
A late-19th century artist's impression of Batman's Treaty being signed

Batman sought land grants in the Western Port area, but the New South Wales colonial authorities rejected this. So, in 1835, as a leading member of the Port Phillip Association he sailed for the mainland in the schooner Rebecca and explored much of Port Phillip.

When he found the current site of central Melbourne, he noted in his diary of 8 June 1835, "This will be the place for a village." and declared the land "Batmania".

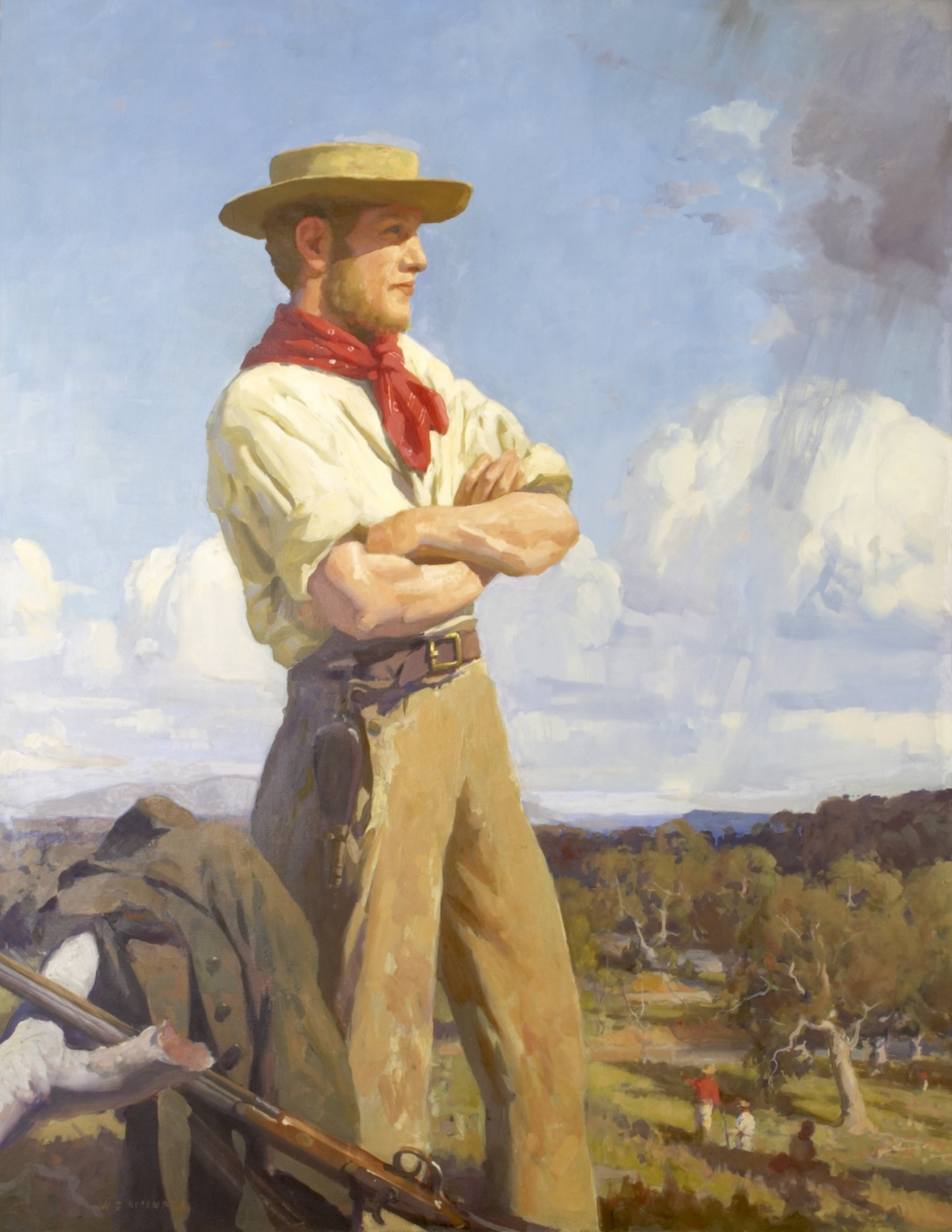
Painting of Batman by William Beckwith McInnes

Batman's Treaty negotiations with Kulin peoples (Aboriginal peoples of now central Victoria) took place in June 1835 on the banks of the Merri Creek in present-day Northcote (an inner suburb of Melbourne), "...using legal advice from the former Van Diemen's Land attorney-general, Joseph Gellibrand, and with the support of his "Sydney Blacks", which were his Aboriginal employees from New South Wales and Van Diemen's Land." These Aboriginal men, namely John Pigeon (Warroba), Johnny Crook (Jonninbia or Yunbai), Joe the Marine (Quanmurrer), Stewart (Nillang), Mackey (Macher), John Allen (Lurnerminer), Bill Bullets, Old Bull, and Joe Bangett, performed a central role in the cross-cultural negotiations and the maintenance of these relations.

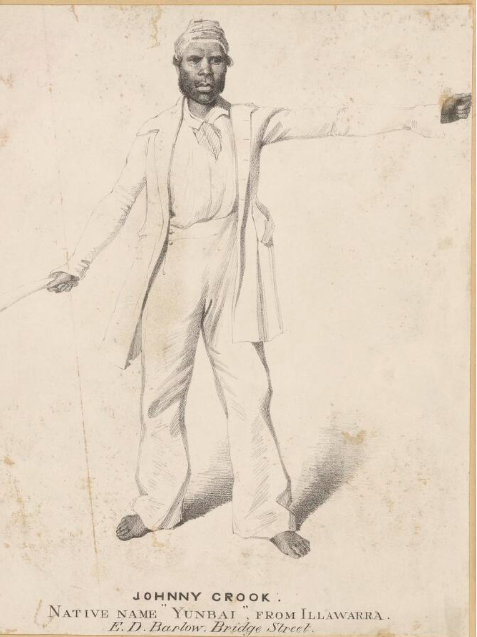
Johnny Crook (Yunbai), one of Batman's "Sydney Blacks"

However, Batman did not visit the colonial camp that was later set up on the Yarra River (i.e., Melbourne) until November 1835. Debate has continued for more than a century over this moment in the birth of Melbourne. Batman writes in his diary on Monday, 8 June 1835 that "... the boat went up the river I have spoken of, which comes from the east, and I am glad to state, about six miles up found the river all good water and very deep. This will be the place for a village. The natives on shore." The previous day Batman and his party had returned from their meeting with the Kulin Elders along the hills bordering the northern banks of the Yarra. It remains quite unclear whether the party saw the 'place for a village' by the 'Falls'—a long-used homesite for the local peoples, and similarly unclear whether Batman was in the boat that explored the Yarra on the 8th. But the site has already been noted for its virtues by numerous Britons including John Helder Wedge and Batman's Parramatta friend Hamilton Hume."

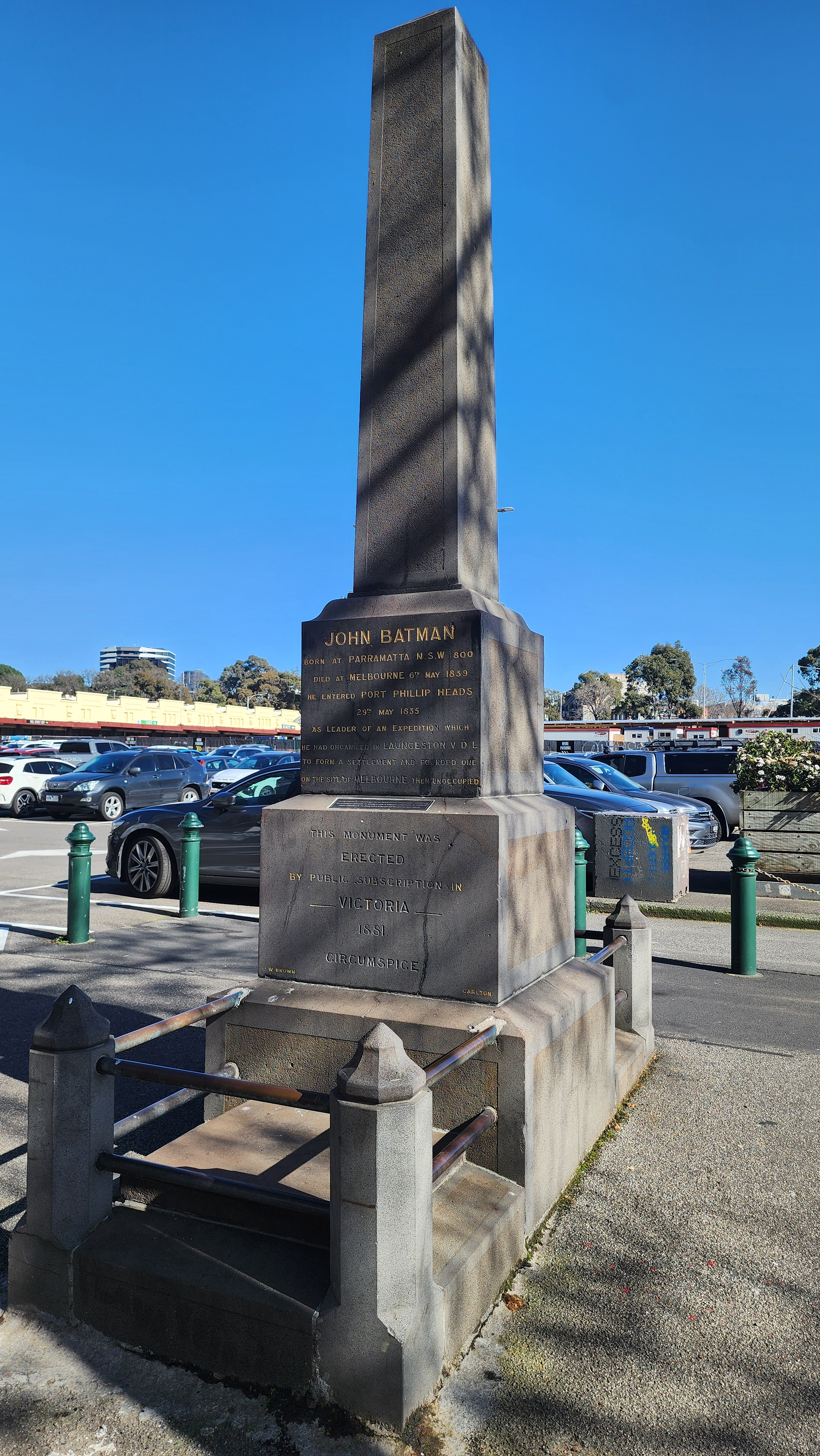
John Batman Memorial at Queen Victoria Market

Batman negotiated a treaty (now known as Batman's Treaty but also known as the Dutigulla Treaty, Dutigulla Deed, Melbourne Treaty or Melbourne Deed), with Kulin peoples to rent their land on an annual basis for 40 blankets, 30 axes, 100 knives, 50 scissors, 30 mirrors, 200 handkerchiefs, 100 pounds of flour and 6 shirts. It is unlikely that Kulin people would have understood this as a transfer of land or agreed to it if they had, but, as Percival Serle wrote, "No doubt the blankets, knives, tomahawks, etc., that he gave them were very welcome". In any case, Governor Bourke deemed such a treaty invalid, as the land was claimed by the Crown, rather than the Kulin people, and other colonists including the rival party of John Pascoe Fawkner arrived to settle Melbourne.

== Later life ==
Batman and his family settled at what became known as Batman's Hill at the western end of Collins Street. Having sold his property "Kingston" in Tasmania and brought his wife, former convict Elizabeth Callaghan, and their seven daughters to Melbourne, he built a house at the base of the hill in April 1836. His son, John, was born in November 1837.

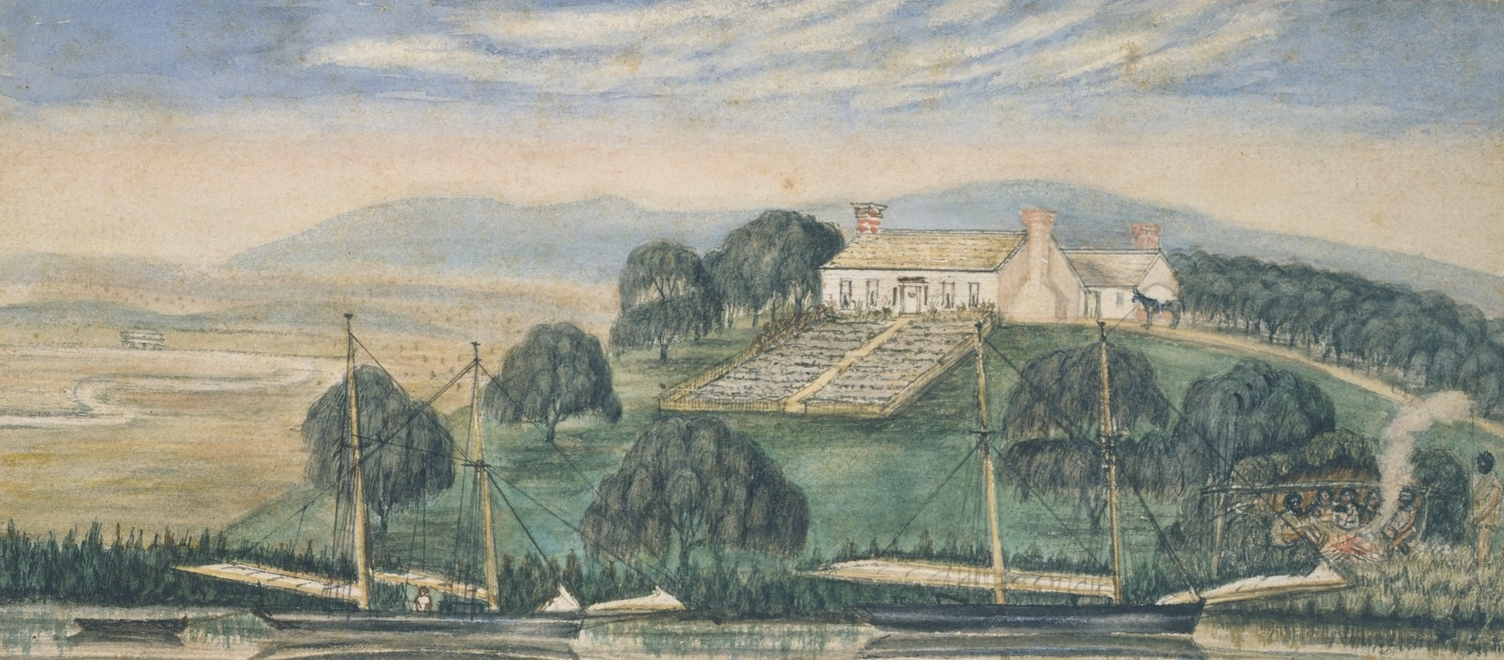
Watercolour of Batman's house on Batman's Hill overlooking the Yarra River

However, Batman's health quickly declined after 1835 as syphilis had disfigured and crippled him, leaving him in constant pain. By the end of 1837 he was unable to walk and was forced to give up squatting and move into trading and investment, but he greatly overstretched his finances and was left vulnerable by his reliance on delegating work to others. As the disease eroded his nose, forcing him to wear a bandage to conceal his ruined face, he became estranged from his wife. In his last months of his life Batman was cared for by his Aboriginal servants, who carried him around in a wicker perambulator.

Following Batman's death on 6 May 1839 his widow and family moved from the house at Batman's Hill and the house was requisitioned by the government for administrative offices. Batman's will, made in 1837, was out of date at his death as many of the assets bequeathed to his children had already been sold. Years of legal wrangling followed his death, led by Eliza Batman, who had remarried in 1841 to Batman's former clerk, William Willoughby, and had only been left £5 in the will by her embittered first husband. The case dragged on, even after Batman's heir-at-law, his son John, drowned in the Yarra River in 1845, and its costs absorbed what was left of Batman's estate.

== Legacy ==
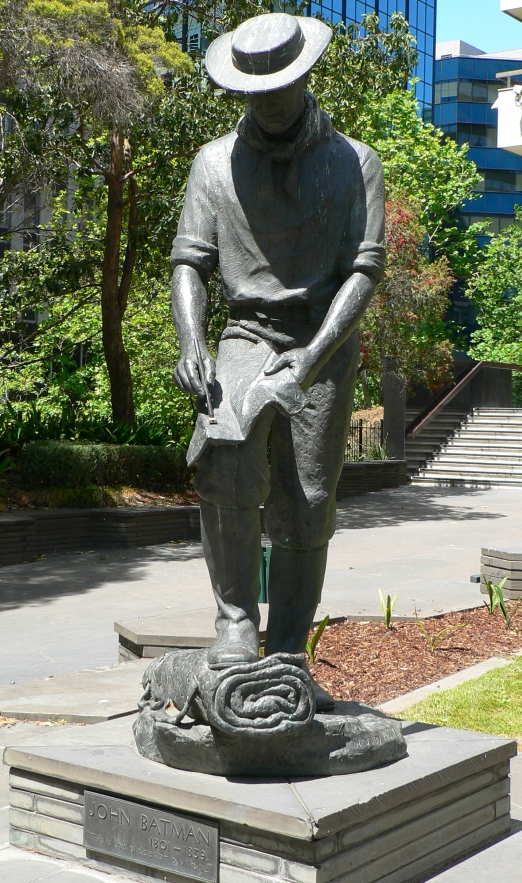
Statue of John Batman at former National Mutual Plaza off Collins Street in Melbourne unveiled 26 January 1979

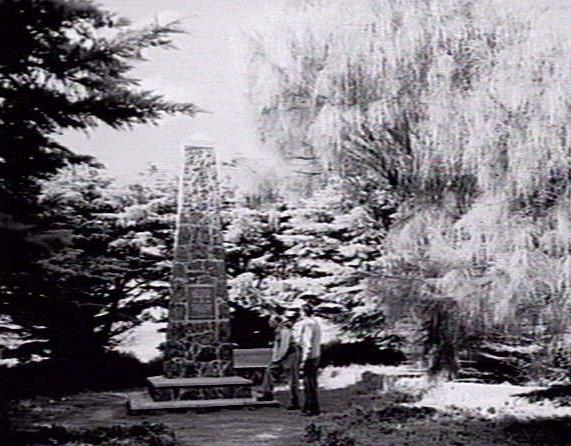
The historical monument marking where Batman landed at Indented Head in 1835

Batman was buried in the Old Melbourne Cemetery but was exhumed and re-buried in the Fawkner Cemetery, a cemetery named after his fellow colonist (and rival), John Pascoe Fawkner. A bluestone obelisk was constructed in 1922 which was later moved to Batman Avenue before being returned to the Queen Victoria Market site in 1992. The obelisk is inscribed with the Latin "circumspice" meaning "look around", the entire city of Melbourne being his legacy. The obelisk also states that Melbourne was "unoccupied" prior to John Batman's arrival in 1835.

=== Controversy over massacres ===
Despite his responsibility for many Aboriginal deaths, Batman is widely considered by the Australian public to have been sympathetic towards Aboriginal people due to his attempt to establish a treaty. Batman's legacy has been challenged in the 21st century, and most criticism has focused on his killings of Indigenous people in Tasmania. In 2016, Darebin Council voted unanimously to change the name of Batman Park in Northcote. It is now called Gumbri Park, after Gumbri (Jessie Hunter), great-niece of Wurundjeri leader William Barak and the last girl born on the Coranderrk Aboriginal Reserve in Healesville.

In 2017, artist Ben Quilty called for Batman's statue to be removed from the Melbourne CBD, describing him as a mass murderer who "makes the American Confederates look friendly" and adding that "changing the inscription [on his statue] to 'mass murderer' might slightly appease my sense of justice."

The Victorian electoral Division of Batman was abolished in 2018 and renamed the Division of Cooper after Aboriginal political activist William Cooper.

=== Places named after John Batman ===
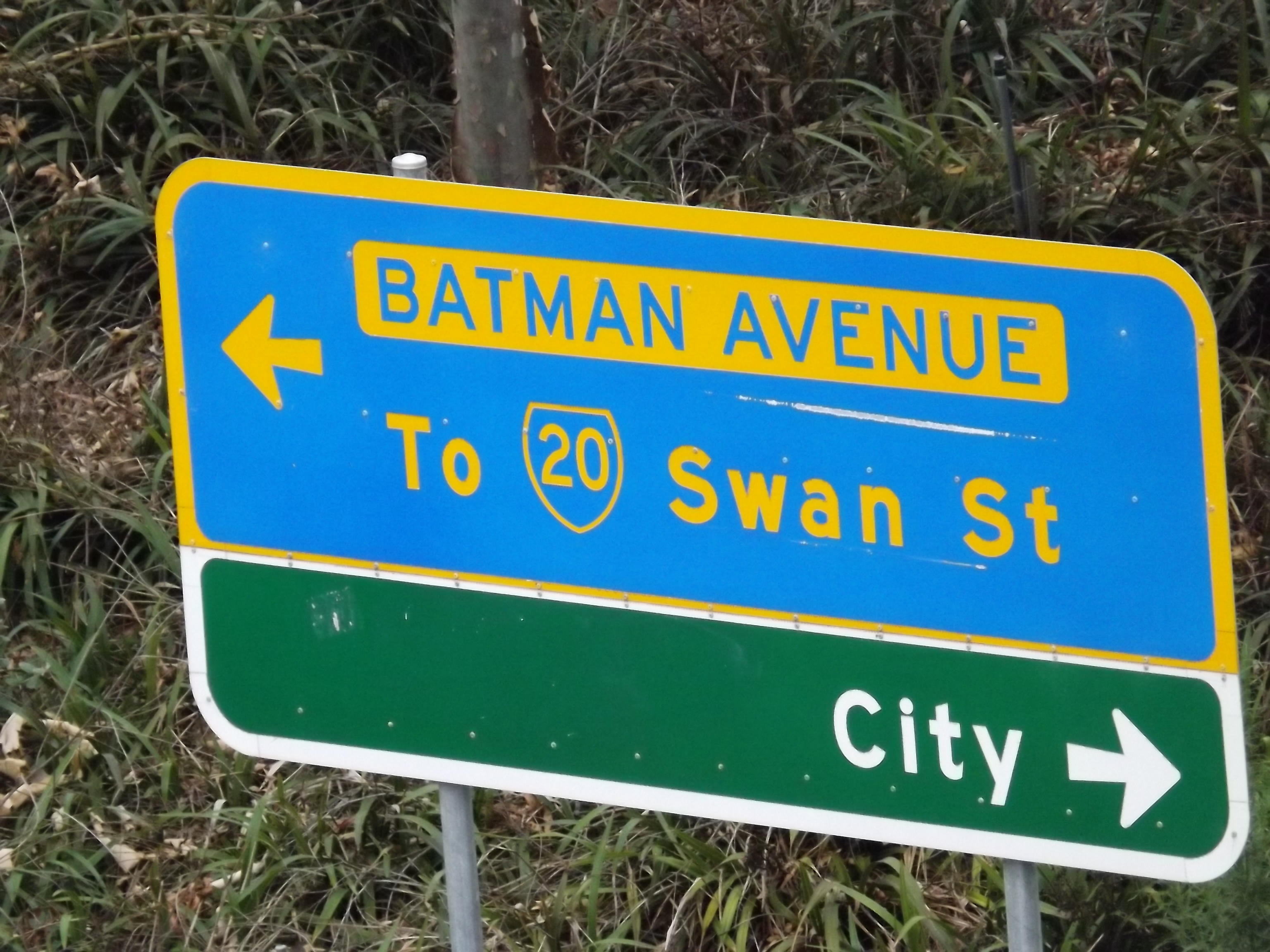
A roadsign for Batman Avenue in Melbourne

- Batman Bridge (Tasmania)
- Division of Batman (Victorian electoral division; now known as the Division of Cooper)
- Batman Park (Melbourne CBD)
- Batman Park (Northcote, Victoria) – now renamed as Gumbri Park
- Batman's Hill (Melbourne CBD)
- Batman railway station (Coburg North, Melbourne, Victoria)
- Batman Avenue, Melbourne
- Batman Avenue, Keilor Park
- Batman Avenue, Sunbury
- Batman Avenue, Hurstbridge
- Batman Avenue, Shepparton
- Batman Close, Thornton
- Batman Lane, Surry Hills
- Batman Road, Eltham
- Batman Road, Indented Head – the original landing site of John Batman in Port Phillip Bay
- Batman Street, Burnside Heights
- Batman Street, Footscray
- Batman Street, Altona Meadows
- Batman Street, Aberfeldie
- Batman Street, Fitzroy North
- Batman Street, Portarlington
- Batman Street, Braddon
- Batman Walk, Parramatta
- John Batman Drive, Melton West
- John Batman Gardens, Sandringham

== See also ==
- History of Melbourne
- Strandloper – a novel by Alan Garner involving John Batman
- The Roving Party – a novel by Rohan Wilson involving John Batman

== Bibliography ==
- Boyce, James (2012) [2011]. 1835: The Founding of Melbourne and the Conquest of Australia. Melbourne, Victoria: Black Inc. ISBN 9781863955683.
