= Enterprize (replica) =

Australian replica schooner

History

Australia
- Namesake: Enterprize (1829)
- Owner: Enterprize Ship Trust
- Laid down: October 1991
- Launched: 30 August 1997
- Home port: Docklands, Melbourne
- Status: Active as of 2023
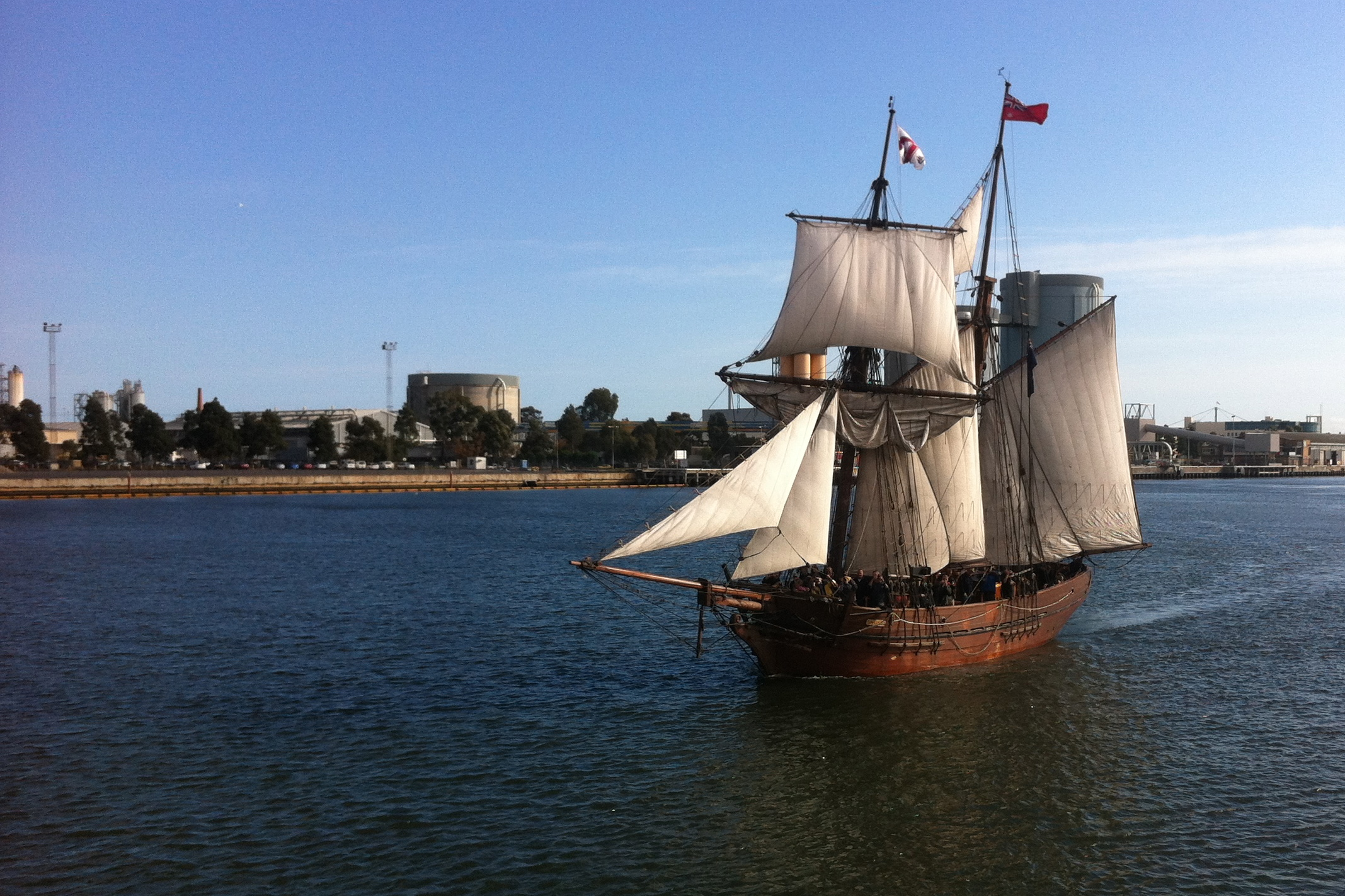
- Enterprize replica sailing on the Yarra River in 2012

General characteristics
- Type: Topsail schooner; museum ship
- Displacement: 72 tonnes
- Length: 27 m (89 ft), bowsprit to stern
- Beam: 5.4 m (18 ft)
- Height: 19.1 m (63 ft) mast to waterline
- Draught: 3 m (9.8 ft)
- Propulsion: Auxiliary: Cummins 6BT diesel
- Sail plan: Topsail schooner; 10 flax sails; Sail area: 190 square metres (2,000 sq ft)

The Enterprize is a replica topsail schooner built in Melbourne, Australia. It is currently operated by a not-for-profit group for the purpose of providing the people of Melbourne with a means of experiencing nineteenth century sailing and the city's history.

== Building the replica ==
Planning of a replica began in 1989 and construction commenced in 1991, with the keel laid at the Melbourne Maritime Museum. It was completed at the Old Ports and Harbour Yard in Williamstown, Victoria, and was officially launched by Felicity Kennett, the wife of the Premier of Victoria, Jeff Kennett, on the 162nd Melbourne Day in 1997.

The replica took six years to build, as it was constructed using traditional 19th century methods. It was made using Australian-grown timber, much of which was recycled, including varieties of wood such as jarrah, Huon pine, kauri, celerytop pine and ironbark. The ship's two masts are local California redwood. Its sails are traditional hand-sewn flax, and its rigging is traditional tarred hemp.

The replica was launched on 30 August 1997 at Hobson's Bay for a total cost of $2.5 million. The Enterprize was the first square-rigged commercial sailing ship to be built in Melbourne in 120 years.

== The original Enterprize ==
The original schooner Enterprize (1829) was built in Hobart in 1829 by William Pender. It was used as a cargo vessel till 1835, after which it was purchased by John Pascoe Fawkner to carry a settlement party to the future site of Melbourne. It was captained by Peter Hunter. After the settlement, the ship was then used as a trading vessel till 1847, when it was wrecked on the shoal of the Richmond River in northern New South Wales.

== Current activity ==
The replica Enterprize operates both short and long sails for the public, and for school and private groups. Her most common sails have been one hour daytime sails, 1.5 hour evening sails, one day school excursions, and evening and overnight voyages between Docklands and Geelong, Portarlington, and Mornington. It has also offered 4–5 day school voyages, 6–8 day public voyages, one day private charters, and overnight private charters.
