= Melbourne Day =

Melbourne Day is an annual celebration to mark the founding of Melbourne in Victoria, Australia, on 30 August 1835.

Melbourne was settled on 30 August 1835 by a party of free settlers from Van Diemen's Land. The party was led by John Lancey aboard the schooner Enterprize, and was funded by the businessman John Pascoe Fawkner. The settlement followed a treaty with the indigenous Aboriginal group, the Wurundjeri of the Kulin nation alliance, which was negotiated by John Batman on behalf of the Port Phillip Association.

Melbourne differs from Australia's other early colonial cities, in that it was founded by businessmen and free settlers - without the permission of The Crown. However, it was later transferred as a settlement of The Crown on 4 March 1837.

== Foundations ==
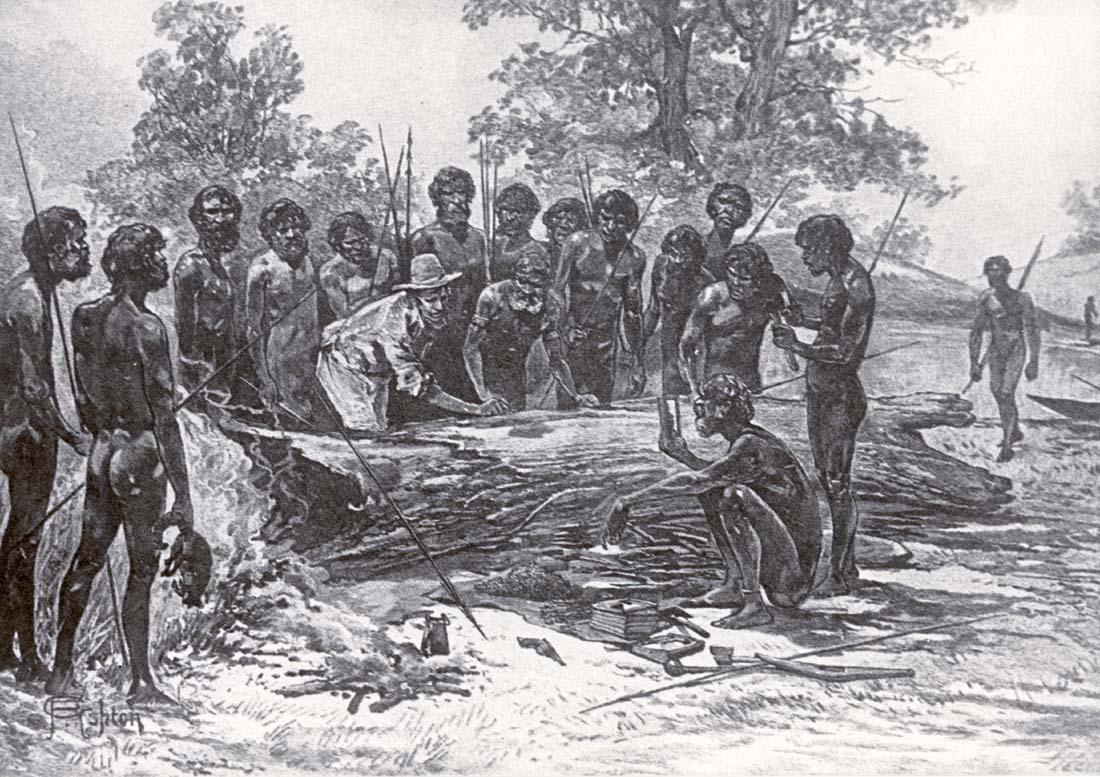
Artist's impression of the signing of Batman's Treaty

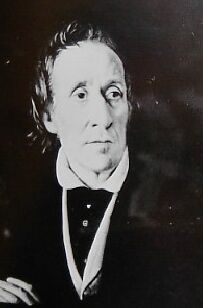
John Pascoe Fawkner

=== Batman's Treaty ===
In April 1835, John Batman, a prominent grazier and a member of the Geelong and Dutigalla Association (later Port Phillip Association), sailed from Launceston on the island of Van Diemen's Land (now the State of Tasmania), aboard the schooner Rebecca, in search of fresh grazing land in the south-east of the Colony of New South Wales (the mainland Australian continent). He sailed across Bass Strait, into the bay of Port Phillip, and arrived at the mouth of the Yarra River in May. After exploring the surrounding area, he met with the elders of the indigenous Aboriginal group, the Wurundjeri of the Kulin nation alliance, and negotiated a transaction for 600,000 acres (2,400 km^{2}; 940 mi^{2}) - which later became known as Batman's Treaty. The transaction - which is believed to have taken place on the bank of Merri Creek (near the modern day suburb of Northcote), consisted of an offering of: blankets, knives, mirrors, sugar, and other such items; to be also tributed annually to the Wurundjeri. The last sentence of Batman's journal entry on this day became famous as the founding charter of the settlement.

So the boat went up the large river. And, I am glad to state about six miles up found the river all good water and very deep. This will be the place for a village.

— Journal of John Batman (8 June 1835).

Upon returning to Van Diemen's Land, Batman's treaty was deemed invalid by the governor of New South Wales, Richard Bourke, under the Proclamation of Governor Bourke in August. It was the belief of Governor Bourke, as well as the Governor of Van Diemen's Land, George Arthur, that the Aboriginal people did not have any official claims to the lands of the Australian continent. The proclamation formally declared, under the doctrine of terra nullius, that The Crown owned the whole of the Australian continent and that only it alone could sell and distribute land. It therefore voided any contracts or treaties made without the consent of the government, and declared any person attempting to rely on such a treaty to be trespassing. However, at the time the proclamation was being drawn up, a prominent businessman from Van Diemen's Land, John Pascoe Fawkner, had also funded an expedition to the area; which sailed from George Town aboard the schooner Enterprize. At the same time, the Port Phillip Association had also funded a second expedition; which sailed from Launceston aboard the Rebecca.

=== Fawkner's fait accompli ===
The settlement party aboard the Enterprize entered the Yarra River, and anchored close to the site chosen by Batman, on 29 August. The party went ashore the following day (near what is the modern day William Street, on what is now Melbourne Day) and landed their stores, livestock and began to construct the settlement. The Association party aboard the Rebecca arrived in September after spending time at a temporary camp at Indented Head, where they encountered William Buckley - a believed-dead, escaped convict; who had been living with the indigenous Aboriginal group, the Wathaurong of the Kulin nation alliance, for 32 years. Batman was dismayed to discover the settlers of the Enterprize had established a settlement in the area and informed the settlers that they were trespassing on the Association's land. However, under the Proclamation of Governor Bourke, both the parties were in fact trespassing on Crown land. When Fawkner - noted for his democratic nature - arrived in October, following tense arguments between the two parties, negotiation were made for land to be shared equally.

As Fawkner had arrived after the two parties, he was aware of the Proclamation of Governor Bourke - which had gained approval from the Colonial Office in October. He knew that cooperation would be vital if the settlement was to continue to exist fait accompli. Land was then divided, and the settlement existed peacefully, but without a formal system of governance. It was referred to by a number of names, including: "Batmania" and "Bearbrass" - of which the latter was agreed upon by Batman and Fawkner. Fawkner assumed a leading role in the establishment of Bearbrass; which, by early 1836, consisted of 177 European settlers (142 male and 35 female settlers). The Secretary of State for the Colonies, Charles Grant, recognised the settlement's fait accompli that same year, and authorised Governor Bourke to transfer Bearbrass to a Crown settlement. Batman and the Port Phillip Association were compensated £7,000 for the land. In March 1837, it was officially renamed Melbourne in honour of the prime minister of the United Kingdom, William Lamb (the Lord Melbourne).

== Founders conjecture ==
Since its early settlement there has been some conjecture around who is the rightful founder of Melbourne. Many believe Batman to be the rightful founder - as he negotiated a treaty and lease of land from the Wurundjeri. However, it has been brought into question whether the Wurundjeri properly understood Batman's intentions. Others believe Fawkner to be the rightful founder - as he funded the first settlement party to the area, aboard the Enterprize, and was fundamental in establishing order within the early settlement. However, as both men were not present at the establishment of the settlement itself, some also believe that Fawkner's expedition leader, John Lancey, and the settlers aboard the Enterprize, to be the rightful founders of Melbourne. At the time of the settlement's transfer to Crown ownership, the government acknowledged Batman as its founder and paid him for the land - even though his treaty with the Wurundjeri was deemed invalid. Later, historians acknowledged Fawkner as its founder - as he had the vision for a settlement, whereas Batman's interests were initially commercial.

== Melbourne Day today ==
To mark the founding of Melbourne, its citizens celebrate with an annual series of week-long activities, and offers from local businesses, leading up to 30 August (Melbourne Day).

On the morning of Melbourne Day, the flag of Melbourne is raised by the Lord Mayor of Melbourne at Enterprize Park - a small park on the north bank of the Yarra River (close to William Street, on Flinders Street) where the first settlers aboard the Enterprize went ashore to establish the settlement. A special message from the Mayor of Launceston in Tasmania is couriered across Bass Strait aboard the Spirit of Tasmania, and delivered to the Lord Mayor of Melbourne on the morning of Melbourne Day - acknowledging the historical connection of the two cities. The Committee for Melbourne Day acknowledges Batman, Fawkner and Lancey as all influential in the foundations of Melbourne, which is reflected in the Melbourne Day celebrations. A replica of the Enterprize (launched in 1997) plays an important role in the celebrations, as do the Melbourne Awards - which are held on the eve of the official celebrations.

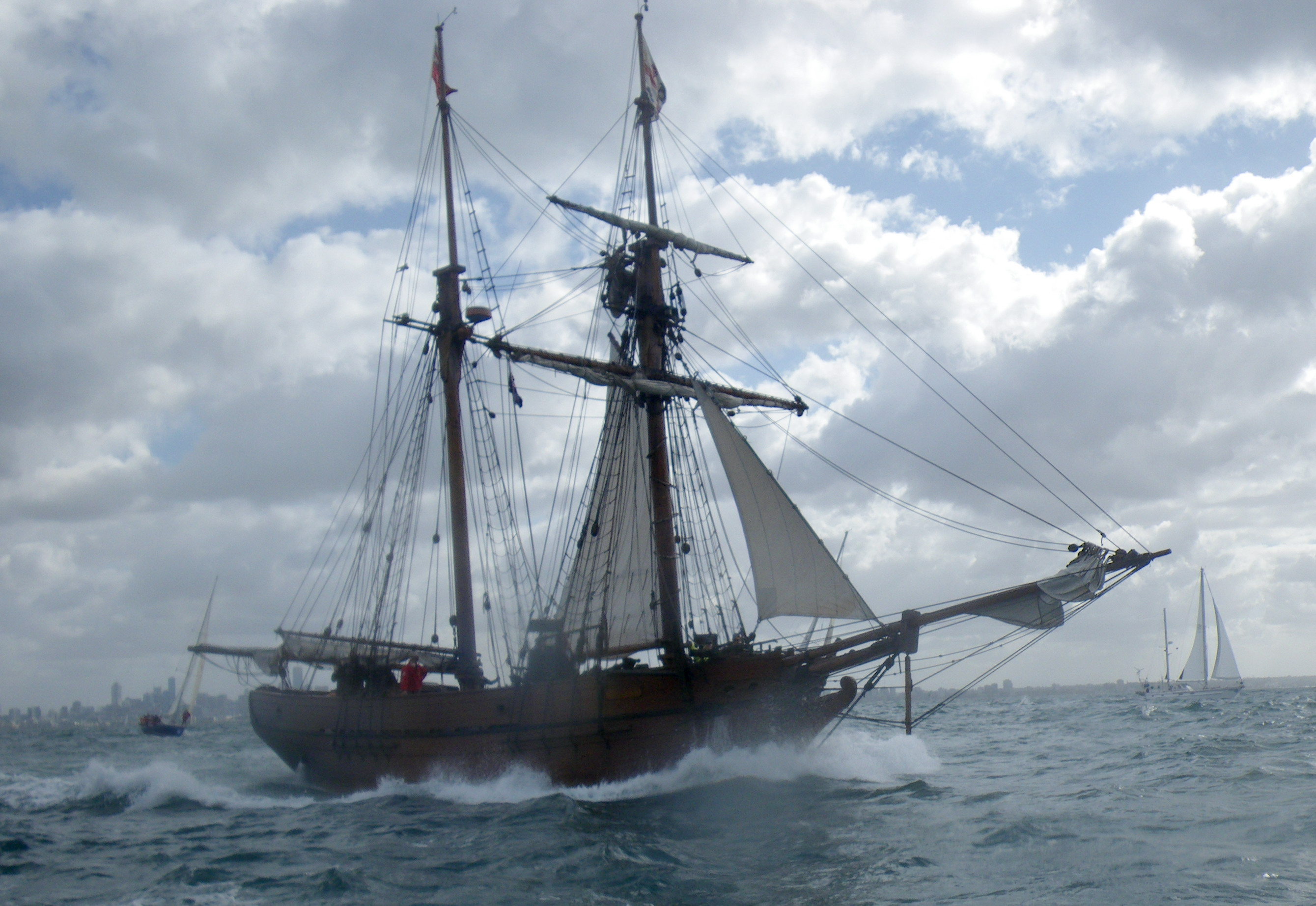
The replica of the schooner Enterprize, launched in 1997

=== The 'Enterprize' replica ===
The original schooner Enterprize was built in Hobart in 1829 by William Pender. It was used as a cargo vessel till 1835, after which it was purchased by John Pascoe Fawkner to carry a settlement party to the future site of Melbourne. It was captained by Peter Hunter. After the settlement, the ship was then used as a trading vessel till 1847 - when it was wrecked on the shoal of the Richmond River in northern New South Wales.

Planning for the construction of a replica began in 1989. Construction of the $2.5 million replica began in 1991, with the keel laid at the Melbourne Maritime Museum. It was completed at the Old Ports and Harbour Yard in Williamstown, and was officially launched by Felicity Kennett - the wife of the premier of Victoria, Jeff Kennett, on the 160th Melbourne Day in 1997.

The replica took six years to build and was constructed using traditional 19th century methods. It was constructed using Australian-grown timber, including: jarrah, Huon pine, kauri, Celery Top Pine and ironbark - much of it recycled. The ship's two masts are local California Redwood, its sails are traditional hand-sewn flax and its rigging is traditional tarred hemp.

=== The Melbourne Awards ===
Since 2003, the Melbourne Awards are awarded to people and organisations whose vision and hard work has helped shape Melbourne. The awards honour a diverse range of contributions, focusing on the people and organisations who have gone above and beyond the call of duty for the city. The winners are selected through an independent judging process, which in turn gives the nominees access to industry leaders and professionals who then often become ambassadors for the achievements they witness.

== See also ==
- History of Melbourne
