= South Wharf =

- Suburb
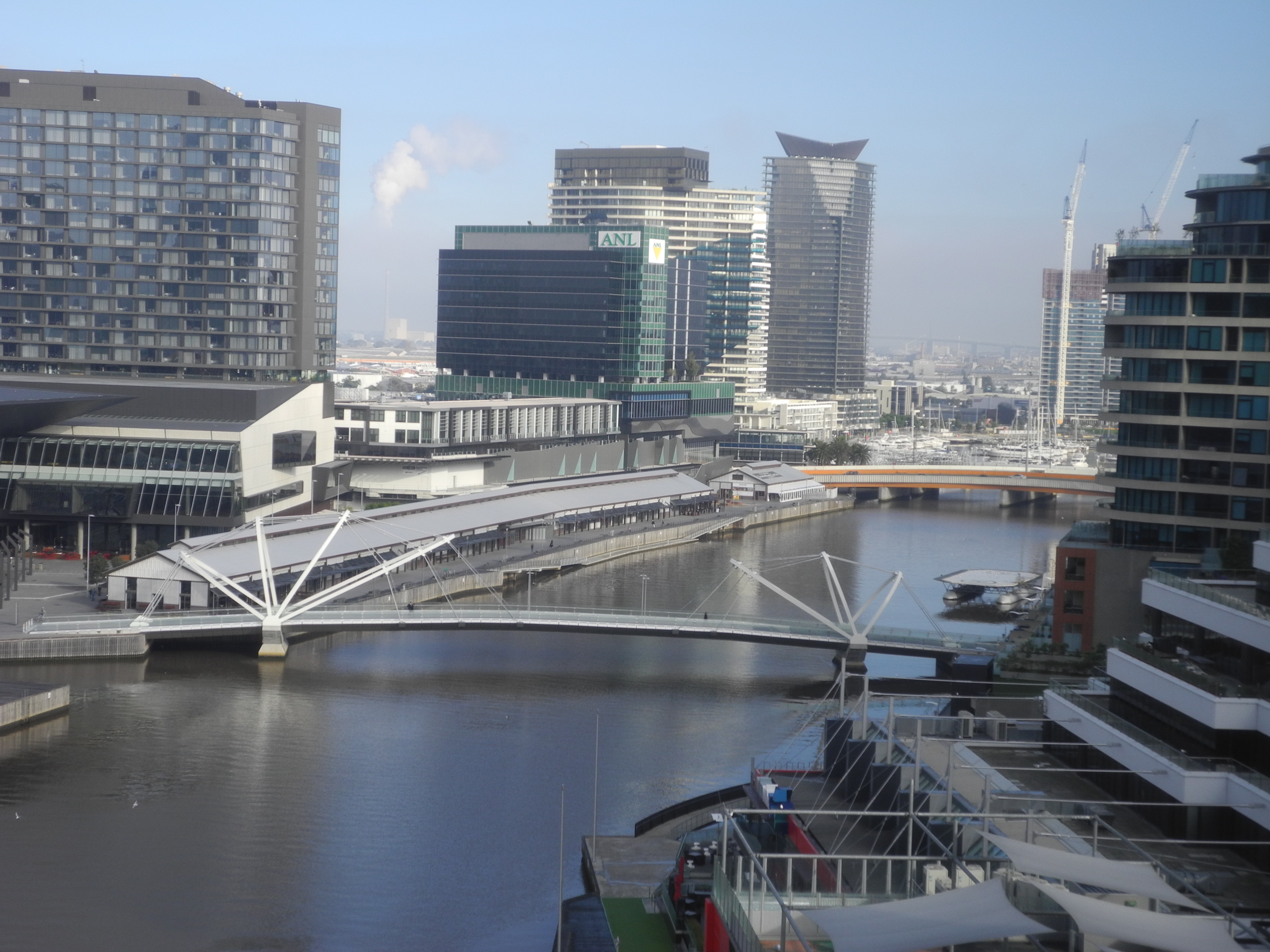
- View of South Wharf with the Seafarers Bridge in the foreground

- Interactive map of South Wharf
- Coordinates: 37.825°S 144.952°E
- Country: Australia
- State: Victoria
- City: Melbourne
- LGA: City of Melbourne
- Location: 2 km (1.2 mi) from Melbourne
- Established: 2008

Government
  - State electorate: Albert Park
  - Federal division: Macnamara

Area
  - Total: 0.25 km^{2} (0.097 sq mi)
- Elevation: 6 m (20 ft)

Population
  - Total: 71 (2021 census)
  - Density: 284/km^{2} (736/sq mi)
- Postcode: 3006
Suburbs around South Wharf
Docklands	Docklands	Melbourne
Port Melbourne	South Wharf	Southbank
South Melbourne	Southbank	Southbank

South Wharf is an inner-city suburb in Melbourne, Victoria, Australia, 2 km south-west of Melbourne's Central Business District, located within the City of Melbourne local government area. South Wharf recorded a population of 71 at the 2021 census.

South Wharf is a small inner suburb south west from Melbourne's CBD. Its borders are the Yarra River to the north, Wurundjeri Way to the west, the West Gate Freeway and a small private car park bordering Ford Street and Munro Street, which is part of the City of Port Phillip, to the south and the former Port Melbourne railway line and Clarendon Street to the east.

Gazetted in 2008 and formerly part of the industrial and shipping area of Southbank, the renaming is part of a wider urban renewal strategy to link Southbank with the Melbourne Docklands.

South Wharf includes some of Melbourne's landmarks, including the Melbourne Convention & Exhibition Centre and the Melbourne Maritime Museum, with its heritage Polly Woodside.

South Wharf is also home to many apartments, shopping outlet DFO South Wharf and the 5-star luxury hotel Pan Pacific Hotel.

A five-storey Victorian warehouse, known as the Tea House (at 28 Clarendon Street), built in 1888, is one of the few buildings which survived the redevelopment of the area.

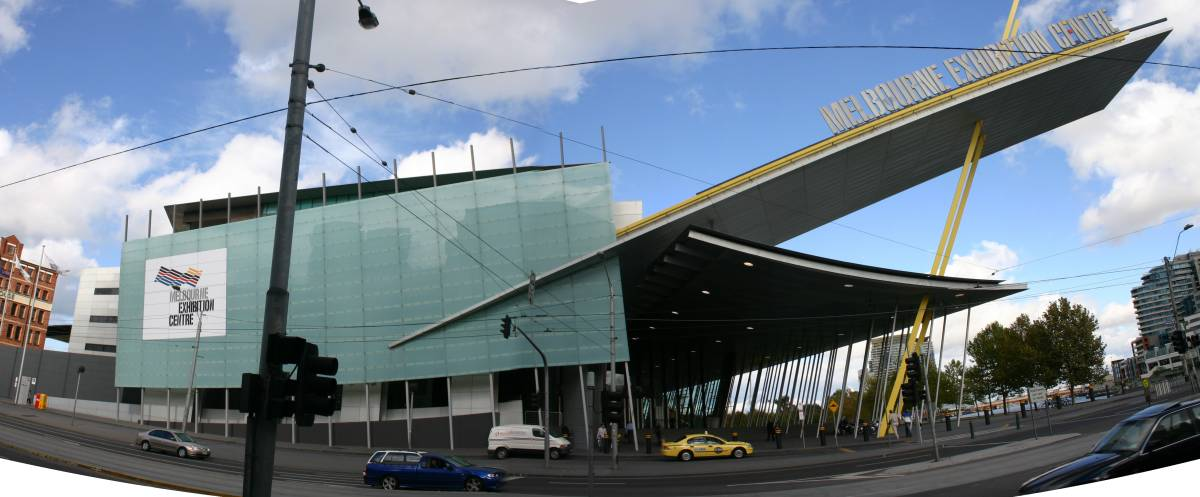
Melbourne Convention & Exhibition Centre

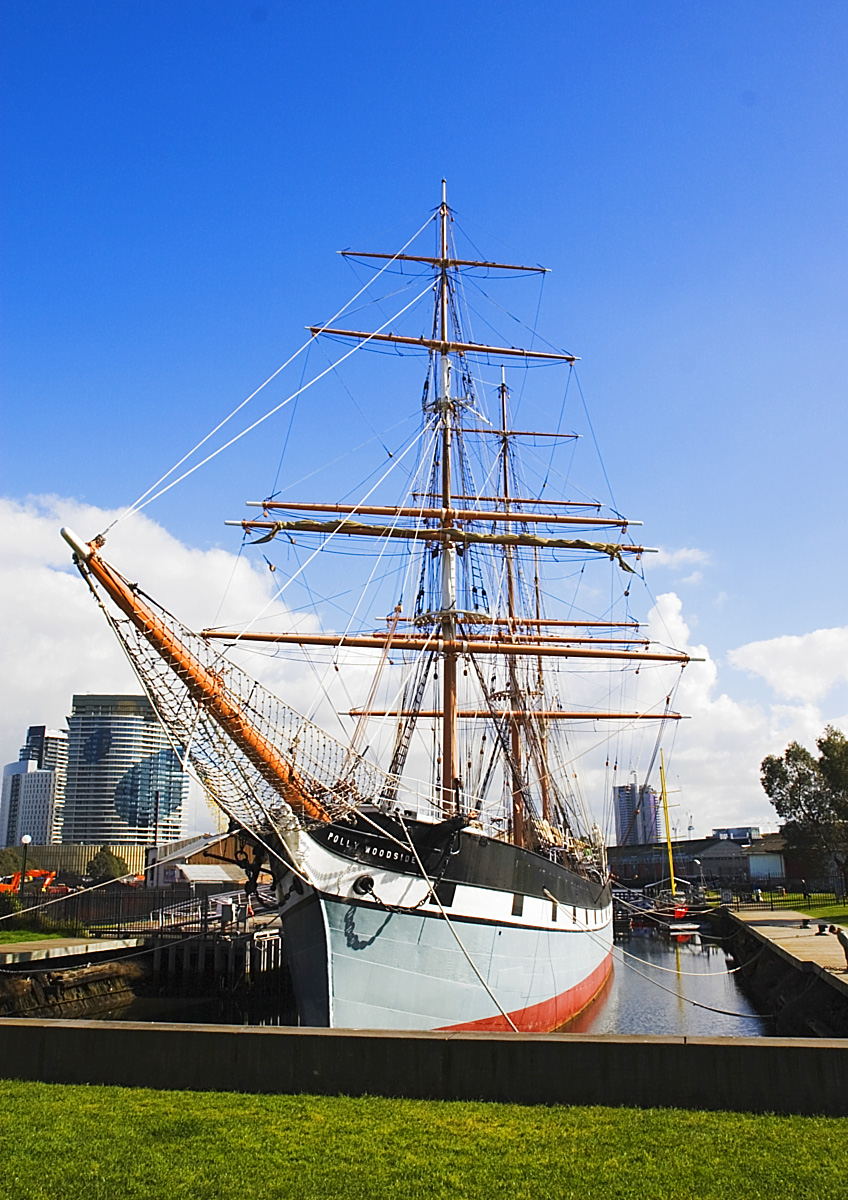
The Polly Woodside

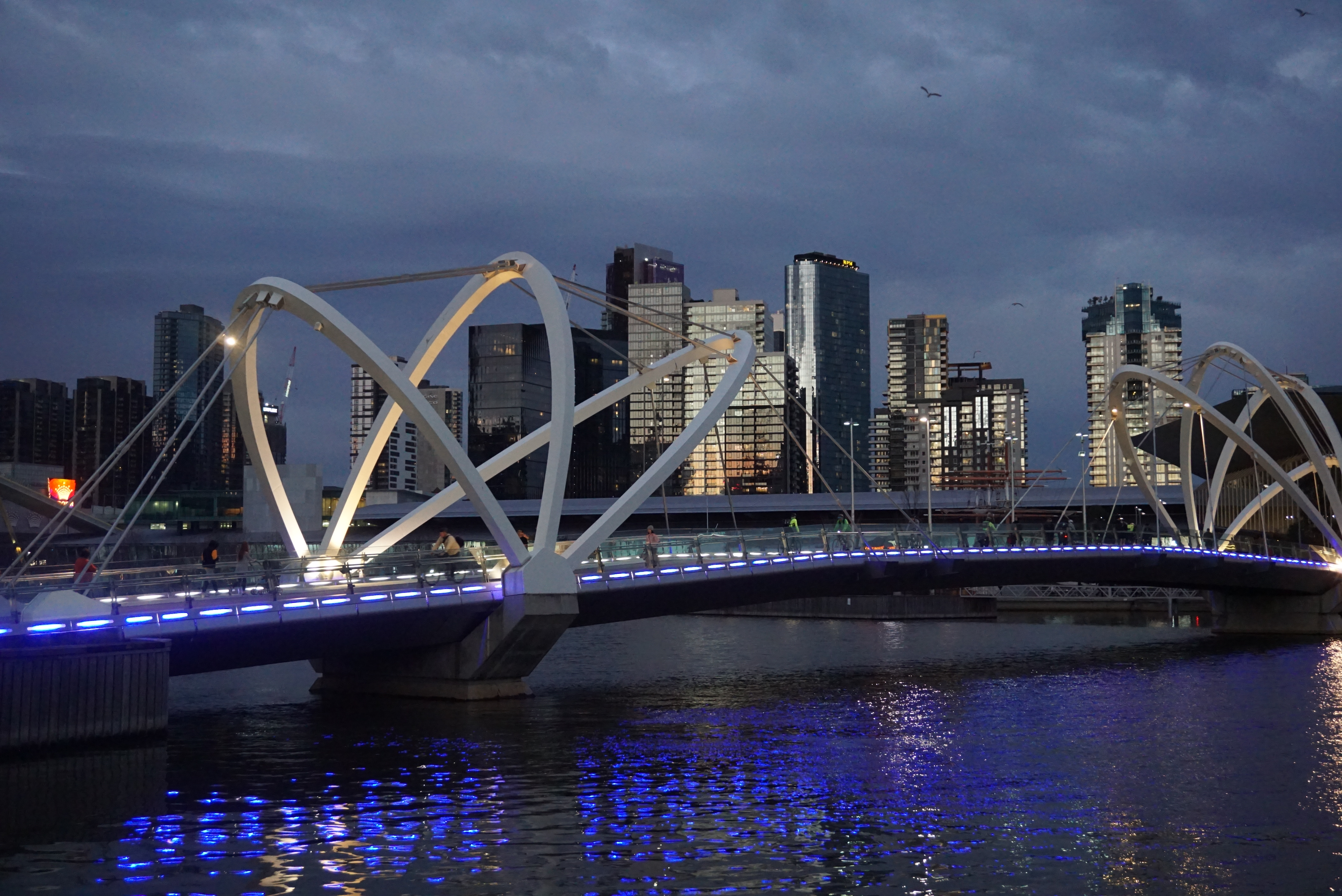
Night view of Seafarers Bridge at South Wharf

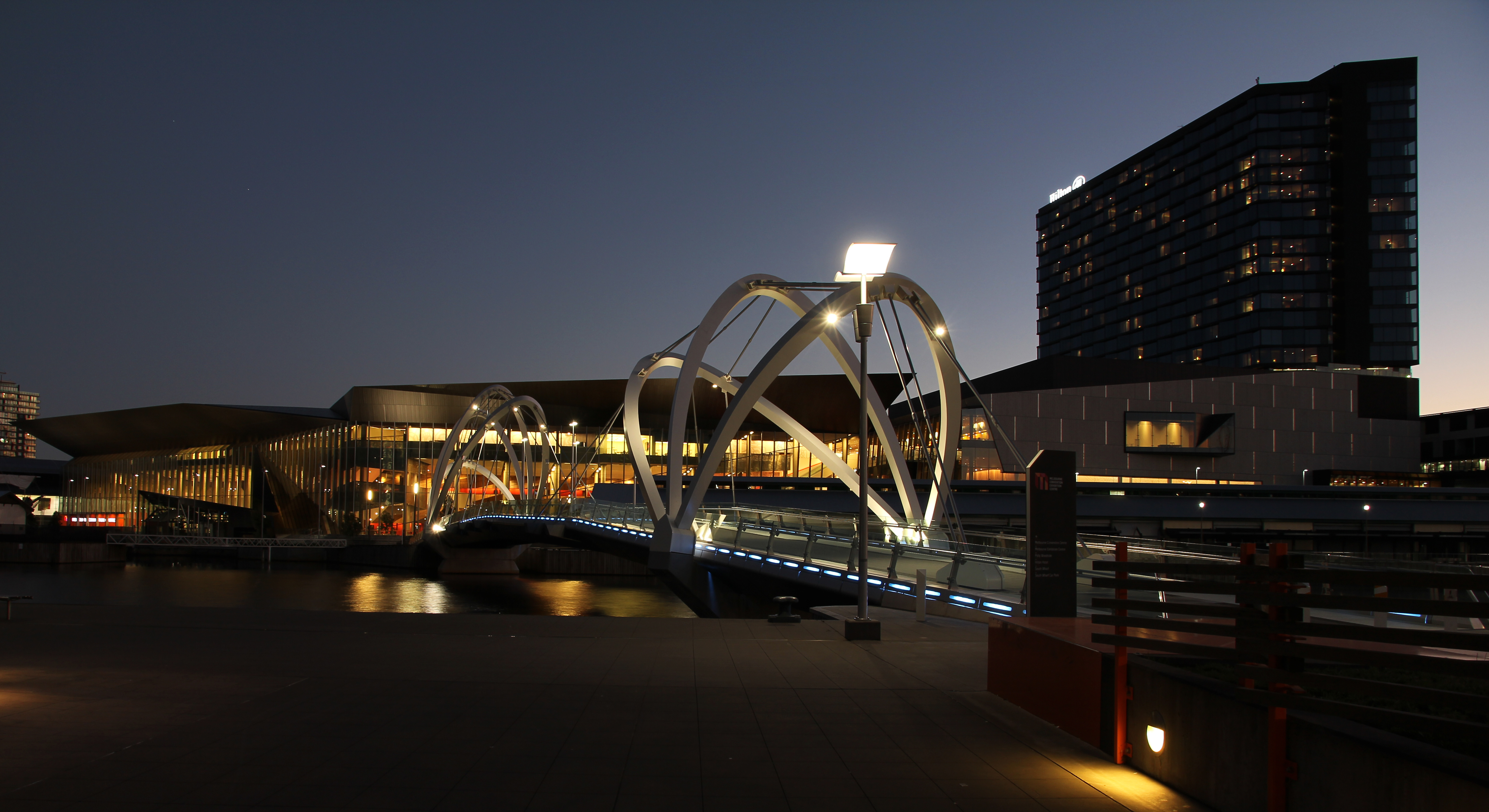
South Wharf and the Melbourne Convention & Exhibition Centre

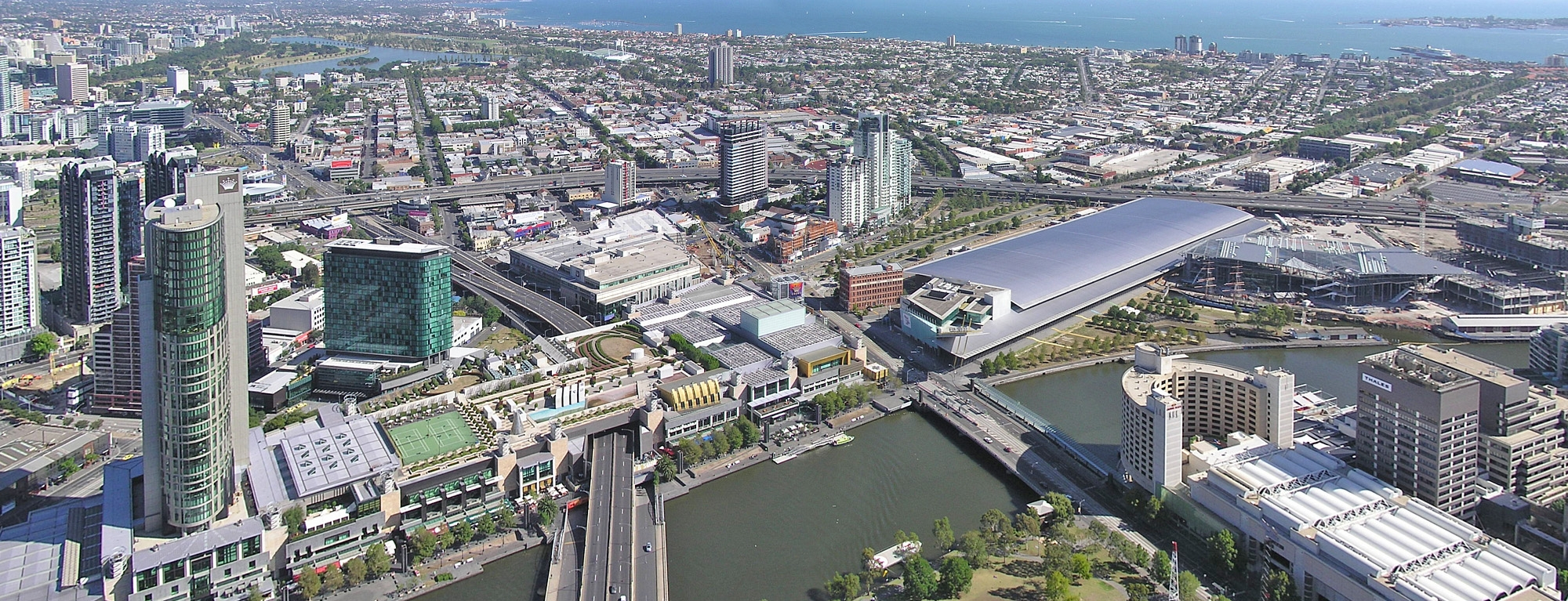
Looking towards South Wharf from the Rialto Towers observation deck
