= Polly Woodside =

Museum ship in Melbourne, Australia

Coordinates: 37.824716°S 144.953356°E

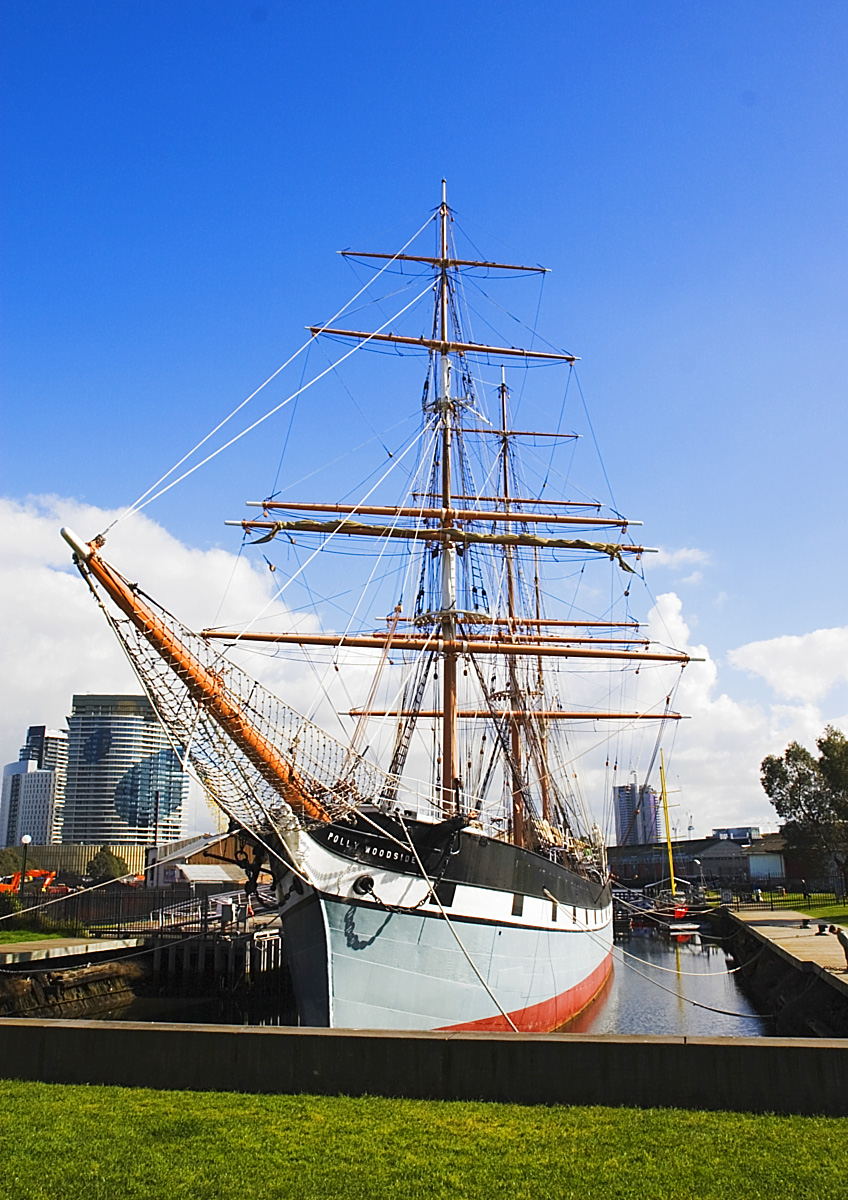
- Polly Woodside, the major attraction of the Melbourne Maritime Museum

History

United Kingdom
- Owner: William J. Woodside & Co, Belfast, Ireland (1885–1904), A.H.Turnbull (1904–1911), Captain Harrison Douglas (1911–1916); George H.Scales Ltd (1916–1922); Adelaide Steamship Co. (1922–1953), Melbourne Steamship Co (1953–1962), Howard Smith Industries (1962–1968), National Trust of Australia (Victoria) (1968–)
- Builder: Workman, Clark & Co, Belfast
- Launched: 7 November 1885
- In service: 7 December 1885
- Renamed: Rona, 1904
- Reclassified: Coal lighter 1922
- Home port: Belfast, Northern Ireland (1885–1904), Lyttelton, New Zealand (1904–1912), Auckland, New Zealand (1912–1923), Sydney, Australia (1923–1925), Melbourne, Australia (1925–current)
- Identification: KDCN
- Status: Museum ship since 1968

General characteristics
- Class & type: Cargo
- Type: Iron hull, barque rig
- Tonnage: 678 gross
- Length: Hull: 192.2 ft (58.6 m) LOA: 230 ft (70 m)
- Beam: 30.15 ft (9.19 m)
- Height: 108 ft (33 m) (main mast)
- Draught: 14 ft (4.3 m)
- Propulsion: Sails
- Speed: 14 kt
- Capacity: 1,100 tons
- Complement: less than 15

Polly Woodside is a three-masted, iron-hulled barque, preserved in Melbourne, Victoria, Australia, and forming the central feature of the South Wharf precinct. The ship was originally built in Belfast by William J. Woodside and was launched in 1885. Polly Woodside is typical of thousands of smaller iron barques built in the last days of sail, intended for deep-water trade around the world and designed to be operated as economically as possible.

== Voyages 1885–1904 ==
Polly Woodside was built at the north shipbuilding yard of Workman, Clark and Co, Queen's Island, Belfast during 1885, for William J. Woodside and Co. She was launched on 7 November 1885; the christening performed by the owner's wife, Mrs Marian ("Polly") Woodside, after whom the ship was named. Polly Woodside captained by Gilbert Yeates, operated as a cargo vessel carrying coal, nitrate and wheat between British ports and the ports of South America, such as Montevideo, Valparaíso and Buenos Aires. In sixteen voyages between December 1885 and August 1903 she made a number of arduous passages around Cape Horn. The Polly Woodside's operating crew, including master and mate, was generally less than 20.

== Voyages 1904–1922 ==
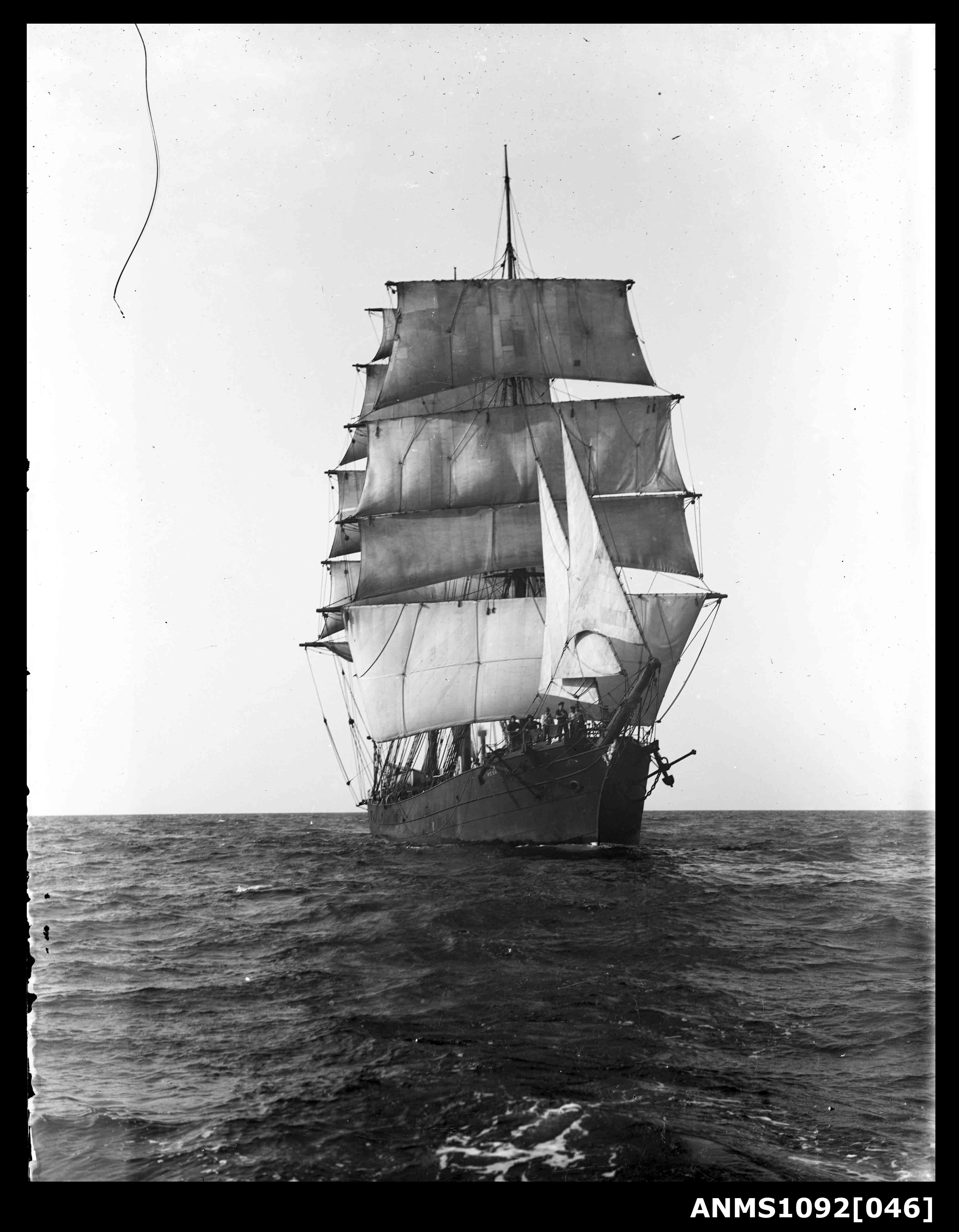
Rona in about 1910. From the Australian National Maritime Museum's William Hall collection

In 1904 Polly Woodside was sold to A.H. Turnbull of New Zealand and renamed Rona after Miss Rona Monro, daughter of a shareholder in the company. Valued in 1906 at £4,300, Rona then generally operated on the New Zealand–Australian run, carrying timber, salt, cement, grain and coal. The ship changed hands in 1911 for £3,000 to Captain Harrison Douglas, of New Zealand and again in 1916 to the George H. Scales Company. Because of the heavy loss of shipping in the 1914–1918 war, Rona also traded between New Zealand ports and San Francisco, carrying case oil and copra. Two mishaps occurred in the last years of the ship's sailing career. In March 1920 the schooner W. J. Pirie, under tow in San Francisco harbour, collided with Rona at anchor, carrying away her headgear. Then in June 1921 the Rona, carrying a cargo of coal, grounded on Steeple Rock, off Wellington Heads. The shingle bottom caused little damage and she was able to be towed into Wellington harbour. However, some slight stress fractures to the hull plating could still be seen when the ship was dry-docked in 1974.

== As a coal lighter 1922–1962 ==
Maritime historian Georg Kåhre has described the early 1920s as the final abandonment of sail by most of the world's maritime nations: "In the hectic economic climate of the great war there had been no question of scrap prices [for sailing ships]." However, by 1922 this had changed: "World freight rates were sliding in the post-war slump; what had been marginal before was now uneconomic." A few larger sailing ships defied this trend, but not the relatively small Rona. In September 1921 the ship was laid up, then sold to Adelaide Steamship Company for service as a coal hulk in Australia. She arrived in Sydney on 8 October 1922, and by early 1923 had been stripped down. In March 1925 the Lammeroo towed Rona to Melbourne for this purpose. She spent the next 40 years quite unremarkably, bunkering coal-burning ships in the Port of Melbourne. An exception was her war service during the Second World War. In 1943 she was requisitioned as a dumb lighter (coal hulk) by the Royal Australian Navy for service with other hulks in New Guinea waters. She was taken under tow of ST Tooronga on 28 October 1943 and arrived in Cairns on 19 November 1943. She was then taken in tow by ST Wato and towed to Milne Bay in New Guinea waters. Captain Douglas Strath described her thus: "queen of this dumb (ie lacking self propulsion) but mighty workforce was Rona. She was big enough to supply, unload, store, repair, construct and function in so many ways... she was an integral part of the vital servicing fleet." She was towed back to Melbourne in 1946, resuming her career as a coal hulk.

== Preservation and restoration since 1968 ==
A number of half-hearted efforts were made in the mid-20th century to preserve Australia's sailing heritage, at the same time as it rapidly disappeared from Australian ports. In 1934, the Shiplovers' Society of Victoria arranged for the coal hulk Shandon (a 1,400-ton former barque) to be partially re-rigged and refitted as a static display, to celebrate the centenary of European settlement. However, by the early 1960s, Rona was the last of her kind still afloat in Australia. A few others lay full of water, abandoned and forgotten—the James Craig in Recherche Bay, Tasmania; the Santiago in the Port River, near Adelaide. The Polly Woodside's restoration owes much to the efforts of Karl Kortum, former director of the San Francisco Maritime Museum, who inspired Dr. Graeme Robertson of the National Trust of Australia (Victoria) to put up a proposal to save the ship in 1962. In the context of the time, this proposal was quite risky but showed extraordinary vision. The National Trust of Australia relied entirely on volunteer labour, and it had no experience in restoring a sailing ship, even for static display. The restoration of the Rona/Polly Woodside would be a massive task. A long campaign led to the National Trust of Australia purchasing her from Howard Smith Industries for one cent in 1968.

An estimated 60,000 hours of painstaking voluntary labour saw the ship refurbished close to its original state. The project received strong support from businesses, unions, former crewmembers and several Captains. The first master of restoration, Captain G.H. Heyen, was a master in sail. Polly Woodside's chief rigger for 27 years of restoration was Tor Lindqvist, a former able seaman and sailmaker on Lawhill, Passat and Viking. In 1978 she was opened under her original name to the public, and is now permanently moored at the old Duke and Orr's Dry Dock on the Yarra River near Melbourne. Now landlocked by a nearby roadbridge, she cannot take to sea like the restored barque James Craig, of Sydney.

In 1988 the World Ship Trust awarded their seventh maritime heritage award to Polly Woodside, for "supreme achievement in the preservation of maritime heritage"—a first for a restored merchant ship. In March 2007, Polly Woodside was added to the Victorian Heritage Register.

== Redevelopment and dry dock works after 2006 ==
Polly Woodside was closed to the public on 30 April 2006 to allow for the major redevelopment of the lower Yarra River's southern bank. The $1.4 billion redevelopment, announced by the Victorian government in February 2006, included construction works for the new Melbourne Convention and Exhibition Centre immediately next to the Polly Woodside. The ship was temporarily relocated approximately 50 metres away to a mooring on the adjacent Yarra River on 26 August 2008—its first move in 33 years—for a $13 million operational refurbishment and restoration of its dry dock home, board walk, and adjacent former wharf sheds. Between this time and May 2009 the water within the Duke and Orr's Dry Dock was pumped out and a gated dam wall built at the entrance. The bottom of the dry dock was excavated and permanent keel supports built into the concrete base for Polly Woodside to sit upon, allowing the ship to be periodically dry docked for repairs. On 19 May 2009 the dam wall gates were opened allowing water to flow into the dry dock and Polly Woodside was returned to the Duke and Orr's Dry Dock. Polly Woodside was reopened to the public on 23 December 2010.
