= Melbourne Maritime Museum =

Coordinates: 37°49′28″S 144°57′11″E

Former Melbourne Maritime Museum
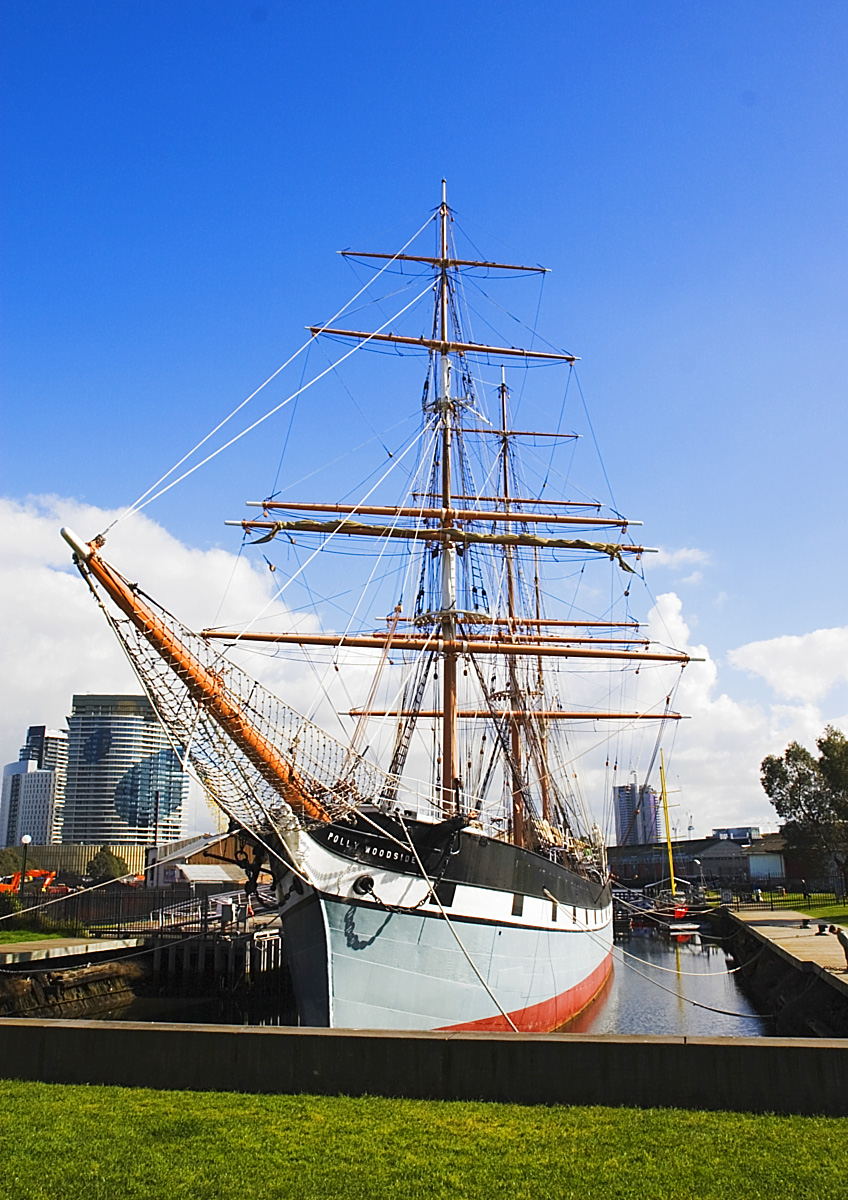
- Polly Woodside barque at the Maritime Museum
- Established: 1978
- Location: Melbourne, Australia
- Type: Shipping museum
- Website: www.pollywoodside.com.au

The former Melbourne Maritime Museum, now, the Polly Woodside tall ship and museum, managed by the National Trust of Australia, is situated in South Wharf on the Yarra River in the city of Melbourne, Victoria, Australia.

It is home to the barque Polly Woodside, the now restored cargo vessel launched in 1885. The vessel resides in an original wooden-walled dry dock. The dry dock was used for the repair and service of ships for over 100 years.

Historic buildings on the site include a pump house and boiler room for use in pumping water from the dry dock. Shed 2 is home to displays, artefacts and models of Polly Woodside relating to her working life.

The museum is a popular attraction for school children and offers extensive education programs for primary and secondary school students.

Facilities on the site include the interactive gallery, a souvenir shop and picnic area.

Regular events include Pirate Sundays on the first Sunday of every month.

Polly Woodside is open for visitors Saturday and Sundays, 10am-4pm and each day of the school holidays in Victoria.

For more information, see, Polly Woodside
