= Enterprize (1830 ship) =

Schooner launched in Hobart, Tasmania in 1830

Coordinates: 28°52′36″S 153°35′29″E

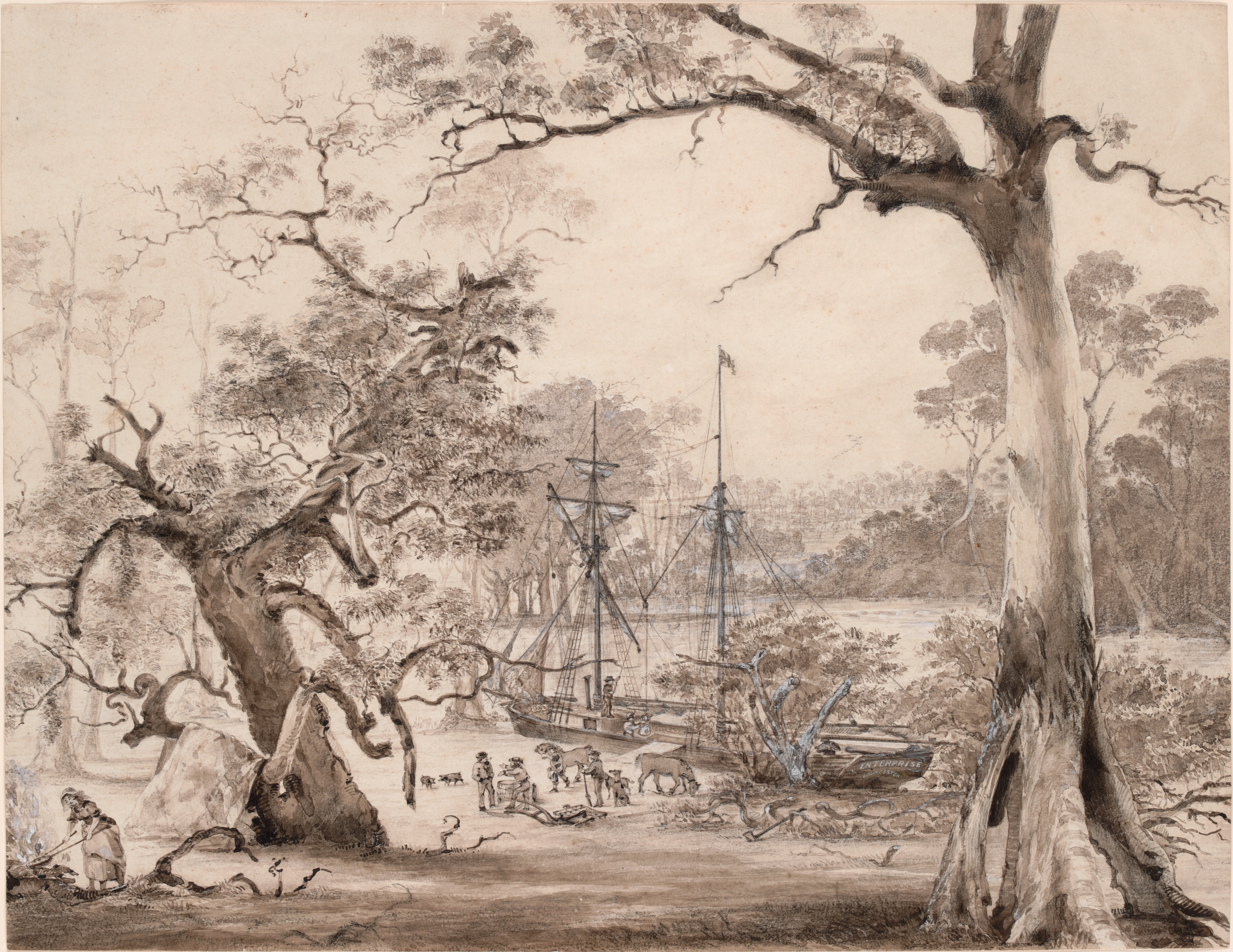
- The Enterprize at the site of Melbourne

History

United Kingdom
- Owner: John Pascoe Fawkner, April 1835
- Builder: William Pender, Hobart, Tasmania
- Launched: 1830
- Out of service: Disappeared from the shipping register in 1847
- Fate: Wrecked on the bar of the Richmond River, northern New South Wales

General characteristics
- Tons burthen: Displacement of 72 tonnes
- Length: 27 m (88 ft 7 in) LOA
- Beam: 5.4 m (17 ft 9 in)
- Sail plan: Topsail schooner

The topsail schooner Enterprize, also spelled and illustrated as Enterprise, was built in Hobart, Tasmania in 1830 by William Pender. It was used for coastal transport of cargo such as coal, livestock, and supplies.

John Pascoe Fawkner bought the ship in April 1835 for use in his forthcoming settlement activity in Port Phillip Bay, in what was then the southern part of New South Wales. However, the delivery of the vessel was delayed several weeks as the Enterprize was engaged in delivering coal in Newcastle, NSW by the ship owner's agent. On 18 July 1835 Fawkner took possession of the Enterprize in Launceston, Tasmania, for a total of £430, after a £20 discount due to the delay.

Fawkner was ready to leave for Port Phillip Bay in August 1835, but at the last moment creditors prevented Fawkner from joining the voyage and the expedition set off without him. On board the Enterprize as it departed the Tasmanian port of George Town were Captain John Lancey, Master Mariner (Fawkner's representative); George Evans, builder; William Jackson and Robert Marr, carpenters; Evan Evans, servant to George Evans; and Fawkner's servants, Charles Wyse, ploughman, Thomas Morgan, general servant, James Gilbert, blacksmith and his pregnant wife, Mary, under Captain Peter Hunter.

On 15 August 1835, the Enterprize entered the Yarra River. After being hauled upstream, she moored at the foot of the present day William Street. On 30 August 1835 the settlers disembarked to build their store and clear land to grow vegetables, and the Enterprize returned to George Town. Seven settlers remained: Captain John Lancey, George Evans, Evan Evans, Charles Wyse, Thomas Morgan, and James and Mary Gilbert.

Separately, John Helder Wedge, a member of John Batman's Port Phillip Association, had left Launceston on 7 August 1835, to also set up a settlement on what the association claimed as its new lands. By the time Wedge reached the Yarra River, Fawkner's party was already settled.

The Fawkners finally arrived at the new settlement on Friday, 16 October 1835, on the second trip of the Enterprize. Fawkner's diary reads: 'Warped up to the Basin, landed 2 cows, 2 calves and the 2 horses." By that time any special claims that the Port Phillip Association may have had to the land at Port Phillip Bay were dashed by Governor Bourke's Proclamation of 26 August 1835. Though legally Fawkner and Batman and Wedge, and their respective parties, were considered trespassers on Crown land, they remained in the new settlement, which came to be called Melbourne.

Enterprize continued operating as a coastal trading vessel for more than a decade after her role in Melbourne's foundation. She eventually disappeared from the Hobart shipping register, having been wrecked on the bar of the Richmond River in northern New South Wales, on 5 July 1847, with the loss of two lives.

The true fate of the Enterprize remained uncertain for approximately 100 years due to confusion with a similarly named ship. On 16 September 1850 a ship called Enterprise was caught by a strong southerly wind and embedded on a sandbar off the coast of Warrnambool. The crew were rescued by a local aboriginal named Buckawall who swam out with a rope in dangerous seas. The ship however, was unable to be salvaged. In the 1880s low tides enabled the public to walk out to the wreck and many pieces were taken and sold as artefacts of "Fawkner's Enterprize". The wreck eventually became covered in sand and a caravan park has now been built over the site in Lady Bay. This ship was thought to have been the wreck of Fawkner's Enterprize from the 1880s until the 1970s when extensive research involving shipping registers and local newspapers was undertaken to clarify the issue.

A fully operational replica of the Enterprize was launched in Melbourne, Australia in 1997. It is managed by the Enterprize Ship Trust on behalf of the people of Victoria. The Enterprize's home port from 1997 to 2011 was Williamstown (South West of Melbourne), where it moored and operated for fourteen years. In September 2011 the ship moved its home port to the Melbourne Docklands precinct. It conducts regular voyages from its home port in Docklands and other places around Port Phillip Bay.

== Legacy ==
- Enterprize Park, along the Yarra River in Melbourne, commemorates the landing of settlers in Melbourne. An official flag-raising ceremony, including a welcome to country by Wurundjeri elders, is conducted there on 30 August every year to celebrate Melbourne Day.
- The replica tall ship Enterprize was built in 1997 as the flagship of the city of Melbourne and to commemorate the role of the original Enterprize in the settlement of Melbourne. The replica conducts sails around Port Phillip Bay, Victoria, and Tasmania, and is open to the general public for sails and inspections.
- The Hotel Enterprize in Spencer Street, Melbourne was named after the ship.

== See also ==
- Enterprise
- History of Melbourne
- List of schooners
