= Michael Nicosia =

Italian-American entrepreneur

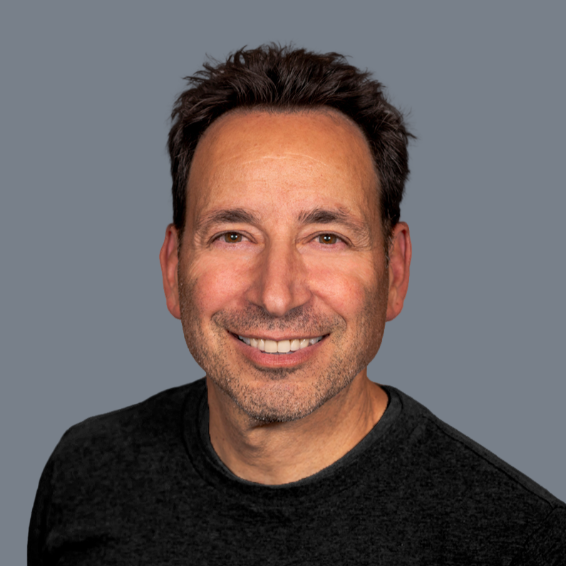
- Born: Sicily, Italy
- Citizenship: American
- Education: B.S. in Marketing, 1988
- Alma mater: San Jose State University
- Occupations: Serial entrepreneur and tech executive
- Organization: Salt
- Website: www.salt.security

Michael Nicosia is an Italian–American serial entrepreneur and software technology executive. He currently holds the position of chief operating officer (COO) and Co-Founder of Salt Security. In 2016, Nicosia partnered with Roey Eliyahu, an Israeli national, to establish Salt, a SaaS cybersecurity startup. Salt Security safeguards the application programming interfaces (API) at the apex of contemporary software application.

Nicosia holds a B.S. degree in Marketing from San Jose State University. He is a US citizen who immigrated from Sicily, Italy.

Before co-founding Salt Security, Nicosia held diverse sales roles in the technology sector, engaging with companies such as AppSense, Liquid Engines, Datasweep, PeopleSoft, and Adallom. His leadership contributions have had a notable impact on the monetization of corporate assets and global expansion of sales for these organizations.

In 2022, Salt Security received a $140 million Series D funding round, propelling Salt to a valuation of $1.4 billion, and solidifying its status as a unicorn startup.

== Early life ==
Born in Italy to Sicilian parents, Nicosia moved to the United States during his early adolescence and settled in the San Francisco Bay Area. Nicosia grew up in Silicon Valley, the hub for tech innovation. He is proficient in both English and Italian.

Nicosia completed his middle school and high school education in Santa Clara County. In 1988, Nicosia graduated from San Jose State University with a Bachelor of Science in Marketing.

== Career ==
Nicosia's professional domain is in the field of enterprise software sales and marketing. In 1988, he initiated his career in the information technology landscape with an inaugural role at Hewlett-Packard, followed by several years as an account executive for JD Edwards.

In 1998, Nicosia became the Regional Vice President at PeopleSoft, a position he held until 2002 when he transitioned to Informatica Corp. In 2003, he played an integral role in the executive team at Datasweep, Inc., assuming the position of VP of Sales for North America. Rockwell Automation later acquired Datasweep. Subsequently, in 2005, Nicosia joined Liquid Engines, where he led the corporate sales force. The company was later acquired by Thomson Financials. In 2009, Nicosia joined Citrix Systems contributing to the company's solution portfolio expansion.

By 2011, Nicosia assumed the role of Vice President of Sales, Americas, at AppSense, a leading virtualization and endpoint security software company located in Santa Clara. He was acknowledged for strengthening the sales infrastructure, encompassing various pre-sales, in-house, and external sales channel for the Americas. In 2016, Landesk acquired AppSense, which eventually merged into Ivanti. In 2013, Nicosia joined the founding team at Adallom, an Israeli Intelligence Corps, engaging in a directional shift in strategy for using their SaaS cloud security solutions. In the capacity of Vice President of Global Sales, Nicosia made significant contributions to Adallom's growth, leading it from $10 million to over $100 million. This growth culminated in its acquisition by Microsoft for a substantial sum of $327 million.

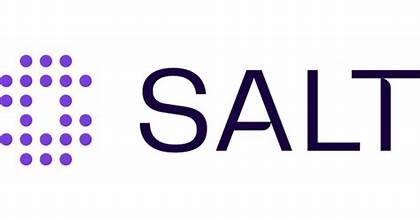
Salt Security

In 2015, Nicosia and Roey Eliyahu met and joined forces to co-found Salt Security, a Palo Alto-based SaaS security company, in April 2016. Eliyahu is the current Salt CEO while Nicosia holds the position of COO. Salt Security is the exclusive holder of the granted patent for using AI to detect and thwart API attacks. The patented API protection platform stands as the sole trademarked API security solution, integrating cloud-scale big data with well-established machine learning and AI capabilities.

By 2022, under the joint leadership of Eliyahu and Nicosia, Salt secured a $140 million Series D funding round led by Alphabet's CapitalG. This round elevated the company's valuation to $1.4 billion, establishing its position as a unicorn in the field of SaaS cybersecurity. In the Series D round, spearheaded by CapitalG, Alphabet's independent growth fund, all current investors participated in refunding. This round included notable firms such as Sequoia Capital, Tenaya Capital, Y Combinator, S Capital VC, Alkeon Capital, DFJ Growth, Advent International, and CrowdStrike.

== Personal life ==
Nicosia currently resides in the Greater San Francisco Bay Area, and takes pride in being the parent of two adult children.
