= VDX =

VDX may refer to:

- VDX (library software) (for Virtual Document eXchange), an interlibrary loan software product
- .vdx, a filename extension for the Microsoft Visio XML drawing file format
- OSEK or OSEK/VDX (Vehicle Distributed eXecutive), a standards body for automotive electronics
- Virtual Desktop Extender, by RES Software, acquired by Ivanti in 2017
