= Cherwell =

Cherwell may refer to:

== Geography ==
- Cherwell, Queensland, a locality in the Fraser Coast Region, Australia
- Cherwell District, an administrative district in Oxfordshire, England
- River Cherwell, in Northamptonshire and Oxfordshire, England

== People ==
- Lord Cherwell (1886–1957), adviser to the British government

== Other uses ==
- Cherwell School, secondary school in Oxford, England
- Cherwell Software, American technology company and software vendor
- Cherwell (newspaper), Oxford University, England
- HMS Cherwell, destroyer in the Royal Navy, 1903
