= Connect Expo (conference) =

Australian business and ICT trade show

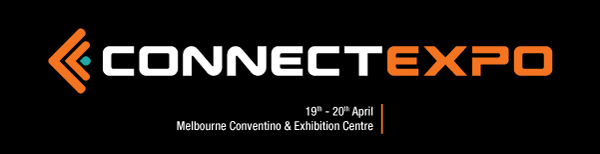
- Status: Active
- Genre: Business
- Venue: Melbourne Convention and Exhibition Centre
- Location: Melbourne
- Country: Australia
- Inaugurated: 2014; 12 years ago
- Attendance: 3,000 (2015)
- Organizer: Association and Communication Events

Connect Expo is an annual Australian business and ICT trade show held in Melbourne organized by Association and Communications Events in partnership with the Victorian government. It was created to increase awareness of advantages of the a digital world.

== Overview ==
The expo runs alongside 11 business summits and features the latest in cloud computing, data analysis, mobility and collaboration, wearable tech, cybersecurity, devices, drones and network infrastructure. The nature of the summits evolve on a yearly basis as the digital environment changes, and include The Next Big Thing Summit, Connected Government Summit, Connected Entertainment Summit, Connected Education Summit, Enterprise Mobility Summit, Big data Summit, M2M Summit, Future Health Summit, the Internet of Things Summit, and Slush Down Under.

== Connect Expo 2014 ==
Connect Expo premiered in 2014. Keynote speakers included Ray Kurzweil, Chris Anderson, and David Gump. Vendors in 2014 included NBN Co, Hewlett-Packard, iiNet, BlackBerry, AirWatch, D-Link, AppSense, KORE Wireless, Alloy, Tunstall, Fujitsu, and other sponsors and exhibitors.

== Connect Expo 2015 ==
In April 2015, Connect Expo was held at Melbourne Convention and Exhibition Centre. The Expo featured 11 conferences covering telehealth, remote medicine, patient engagement and empowerment, apps, big data and analytics, wearable tech, point of care diagnostics and robotics. The event had more than 140 exhibitors and over 5,500 attendees. Technology featured at the expo included robots, virtual reality headsets, 3D photography, and high performance drones. Victoria's Minister for Small Business Adem Somyurek was the opening keynote speaker. The Next Big Thing summit featured keynote speakers Sebastian Thrun, Don Tapscott, and Ray Wang. The FutureHealth summit featured keynote speakers including UnitingCare's Richard Royle, and CEO of St. Vincent's Health Australia, Toby Hall.
