= Melbourne Convention and Exhibition Centre =

Convention centre in Melbourne, Australia

- MCEC
- Interactive map of Melbourne Convention and Exhibition Centre
- Location: South Wharf, Melbourne, Victoria, Australia
- Coordinates: 37.8256°S 144.9541°E
- Owner: Melbourne Convention and Exhibition Trust
- Operator: Melbourne Convention and Exhibition Trust
- Capacity: 5,541 (Plenary Hall)
- Surface: 70,000 m^{2}
- Public transit: Casino/MCEC/Clarendon St: 12, 96, 109

Construction
- Opened: MEC: 14 February 1996; MCC (former): May 1990; MCC (current): 5 June 2009; Expansion: 1 July 2018
- Cost: MEC: A$129 million MCC: A$125 million Expansion: A$205 million
- Architects: MEC: Denton Corker Marshall; MCC and Expansion: NH Architecture and Woods Bagot; Masterplan Lead Designer: Larry Oltmanns

Website
- www.mcec.com.au

The Melbourne Convention and Exhibition Centre (MCEC), colloquially referred to as Jeff's Shed, is a group of three adjacent buildings next to the Yarra River in South Wharf, an inner-city suburb of Melbourne, Victoria, Australia. The venues are owned and operated by the Melbourne Convention and Exhibition Trust.

Following the opening of its expansion in 2018, Melbourne Convention and Exhibition Centre regained the status as being the largest convention and exhibition venue in Australia and one of the largest spaces in the Southern Hemisphere.

The total size of the MCEC is 70,000 square metres. The venue consists of 63 meeting rooms, outdoor courtyard spaces, a Plenary that can be divided into three self-contained acoustically separate theatres, the Goldfields Theatre a 9,000 square metre multi-purpose event space with a retractable 1,000-seat theatre and 39,000 square metres of pillarless exhibition space.

In 2017/18, 1,124 events were held at MCEC. These events attracted 950,385 delegates, including 23 international conventions involving 28,750 delegates and 34 national conventions which attracted 38,626 delegates.

In 2018/19, the MCEC contributed more than $1.10 billion in economic impact to the state of Victoria.

== Management ==
The Melbourne Exhibition Centre Trust (MCET) was created by the Melbourne Exhibition Centre Act 1994 (No. 41 of 1994) in August 1994 with the responsibility of overseeing the construction and development of the Melbourne Exhibition Centre. In February 1997, the Melbourne Convention and Exhibition Trust began, replacing the previous trust with the added scope of the Melbourne Convention Centre, formerly called the World Congress Centre Melbourne.

In August 1997, the Melbourne Convention and Exhibition Trust became owner and venue manager of both the Melbourne Exhibition Centre and the Melbourne Convention Centre.

On 28 August 2002, the Trust was appointed the Committee of Management of the Yarra River Maritime Reserve. The reserve is inclusive of the land and historic sheds located on the south bank of the Yarra River between Grimes Bridge and the Melbourne Maritime Museum. This appointment was revoked in June 2006 as part of the land consolidation process necessary for the development of the Melbourne Convention Centre and associated works referred to below.

In May 2022, the Victorian Government announced that MCET would be the venue operator for a new convention and event centre in Geelong, due to open in 2026.

In August 2024, the entity was renamed to the Victorian Convention and Event Trust, reflecting an expanded role as the operator of two Victorian venues, MCEC and Nyaal Banyul.

The Victorian Convention and Event Trust is also responsible for managing and promoting the use of the Royal Exhibition Building in the Carlton Gardens. As a government-owned Trust, the Victorian Convention and Event Trust is responsible to the Minister for Tourism (4), Sport and Major Events.

== History ==
=== Melbourne Exhibition Centre ===
The Melbourne Exhibition Centre was opened on 14 February 1996 and is known colloquially as "Jeff's Shed" after the then Victorian Premier, Jeff Kennett.

The building was designed by Denton Corker Marshall, an architectural firm responsible for many of Melbourne's larger buildings through the early 1990s, and features their characteristic "blade" entrance. The building was originally intended to be used by the Melbourne Museum but Jeff Kennett intervened during construction to have the building used as an exhibition centre. In 1998 a covered footbridge was erected between the Exhibition and Convention centres, parallel to the Spencer Street Bridge.

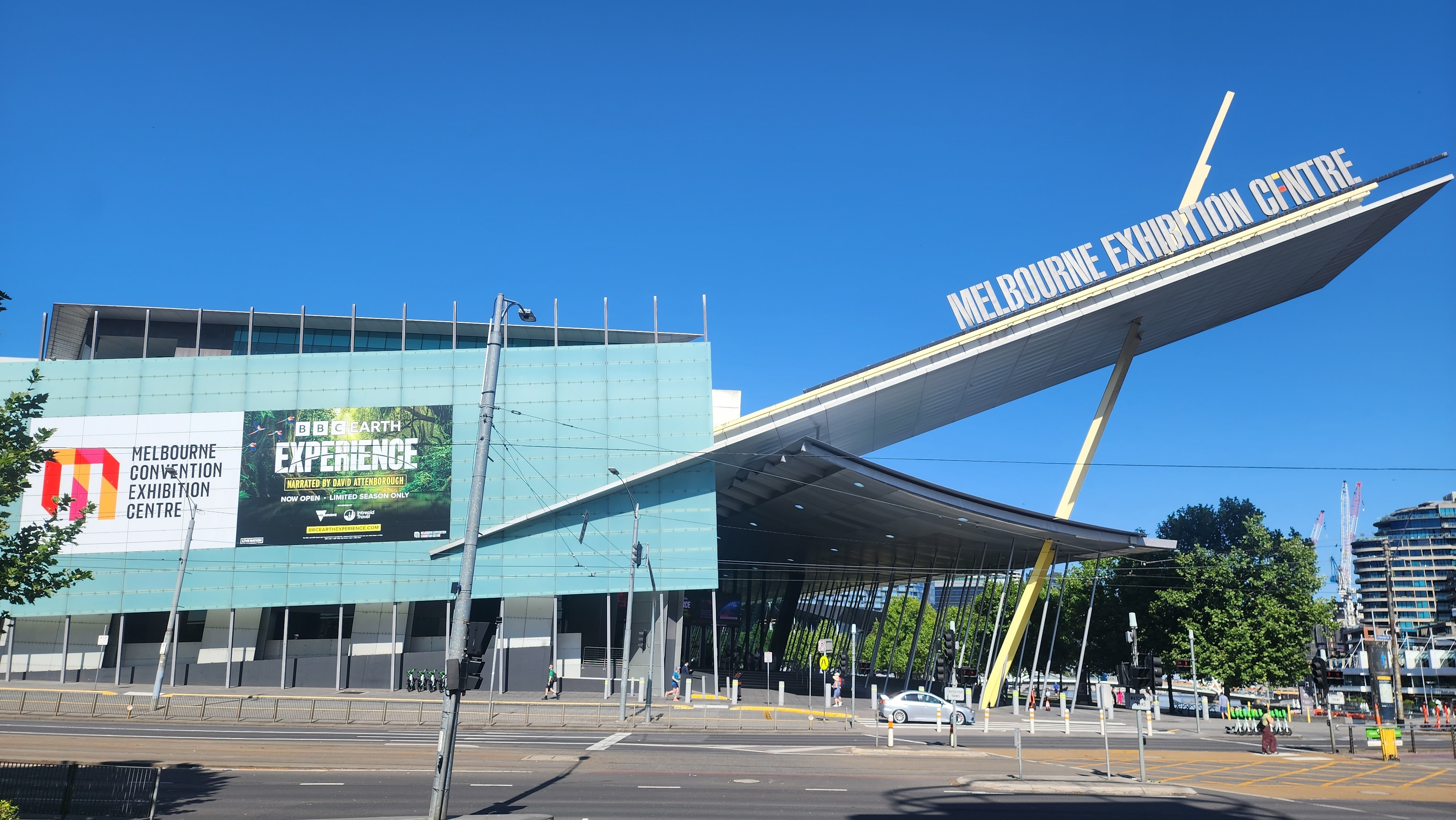
Melbourne Exhibition Centre

The building has become an icon in Melbourne due to the main entrance marked by a prominent tilted metal blade supported by a pair of yellow sticks in combination with the 450 metre urban verandah, parallel to the internal concourse, supported by a forest of smaller sticks. The verandah and the new riverside park make a major contribution to the public realm of the city.

=== Melbourne Convention Centre ===
The former Convention Centre on the Flinders Street side of the Yarra River was opened in May 1990 and has hosted thousands of conventions and meetings.

The current Melbourne Convention Centre, on land adjacent to the Exhibition Centre, was opened on 5 June 2009. At a cost of A$1 billion, the development consists of a 5541-seat Plenary Hall that can be divided into three separate theatres, a grand banquet room as well as a hotel, office, residential and retail space. It was developed by a consortium led by Multiplex and Plenary Group and designed by Larry Oltmanns. The centre uses a range of features in order to achieve a 6 Star Green Star environmental rating and to become the first convention centre in the world with that rating. The architects for the development were NH Architecture and Woods Bagot.

=== Expansion ===
On 5 May 2015, the Victorian State Government announced $205 million for the expansion of Melbourne Convention and Exhibition Centre in the 2015/16 state budget. This project commenced in May 2016 and opened on 1 July 2018. The 20,000-square-metre expansion includes 9,000 square metres of exhibition space plus additional flexible, multi-purpose event space, 1,000-seat theatre, multiple meeting rooms, a banquet room and a café and bar.

The building design was a joint venture between architect firms: NH Architecture and Woods Bagot. The expansion is part of a larger South Wharf expansion project by Plenary Group that includes a new 347-room Novotel Melbourne South Wharf and a new 1,150-space multi-level car park – all fully connected and integrated with existing buildings.

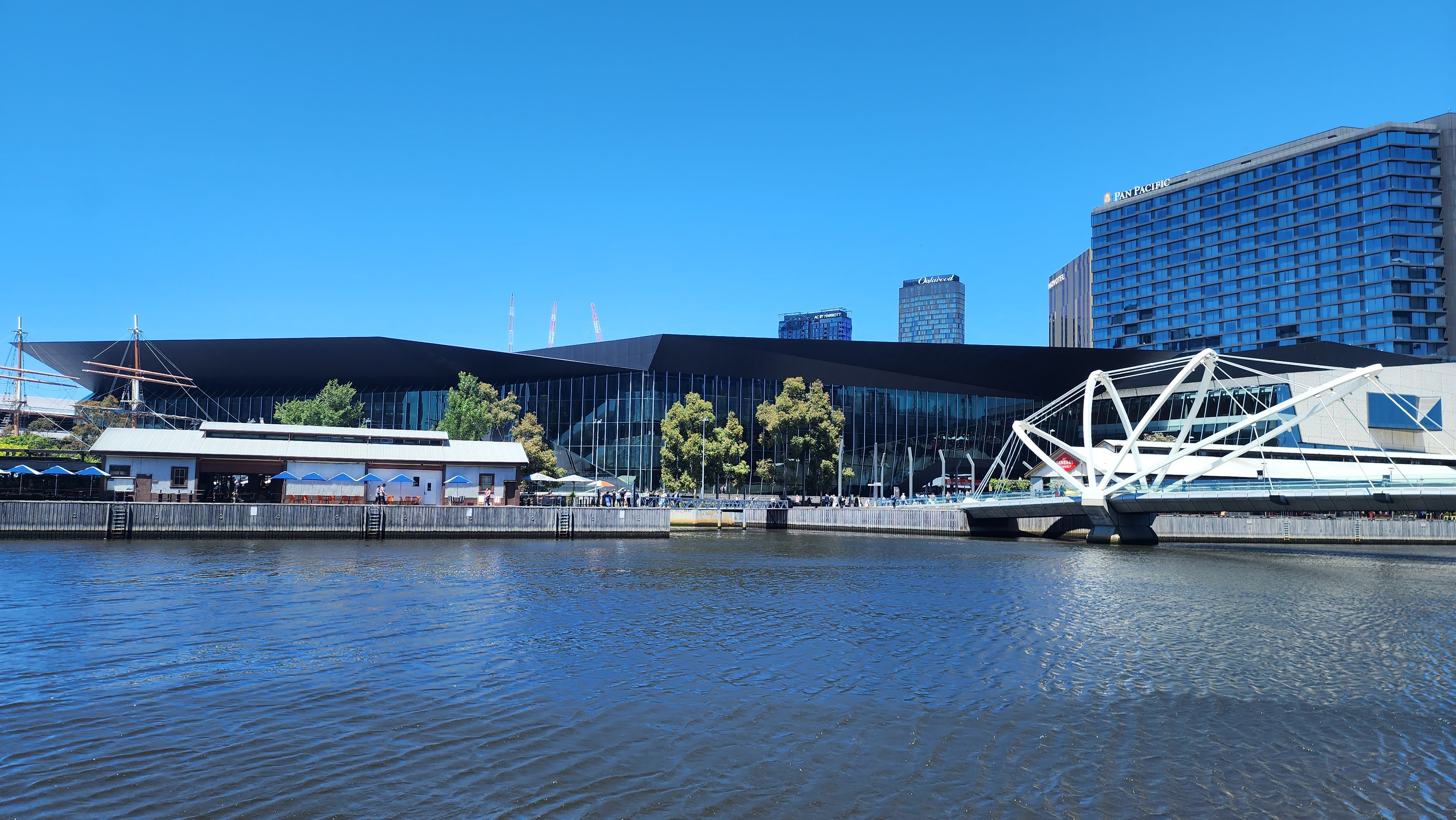
Melbourne Convention Centre and Seafarers Bridge

== Building design and architecture ==
=== Melbourne Exhibition Centre ===
The building resembles a long shed with separated operable walls (each valued at $250,000). This allows the space to be split from a maximum of 39,000 square metres to a minimum of 3,000 square metre spaces. The single volume with a proportion of length to width of approximately 2.5:1 was chosen. Other than the exhibition space, the building also has a basement that is able to hold 1,000 cars. From the main entrance, visitors would be able to see the 450 metres southward vista of the concourse as well as the mezzanine balconies. On the first floor of the entry pavilion and extending along the mezzanine platform, there are meeting and function rooms which separates the double-height hall and concourse. Some have large windows overlooking the exhibition.

The site for the Exhibition Centre was previously the site for Daryl Jackson's Museum of Victoria. The brief required DCM to work with the partially built concrete structure. According to Melbourne architect and critic Norman Day, the column-free space could be associated to the Russian Constructivist of the 1920s such as the Vesnin brothers's Kiev railway station scheme 1926. Another relation to the Russian Constructivist is the cantilevered structure supported by yellow steel props as well as the large metal letters arranged over the top of the entrance.

The building consists of two different roof designs which are angled at different directions. This was due to the intention to create two different successful spaces which is the exhibition space and the public space (concourse of the building). By this method, the architects manage to create two different environments, one which is an enclosed exhibition space and another is the concourse which is open to the public.

Due to the brief that required the building to be constructed in a short amount of time and save cost, a repetitive system of identical trusses clad in aluminium sheet were used. On top of that, the trusses have to be solid in order to provide sound isolation from one hall to the next. At the same time, in order to reduce the span, and to stiffen them laterally, the architects tapered them in cross section.

The two rows of columns that are located in the verandah (the building’s long frontage facing the river) are intended to give a subtle separation of the interior and exterior of the building.

The blades which are located along the concourse are coloured in a series of Francis-Bacon-inspired colours, with hall numbers stencilled on. This serves as a double purpose of punctuating the linear volume and labelling the halls.

=== Significance and contribution to Australian architecture ===
The aerodynamic treatment of the colonnade canopy, which disperses wind, influenced another Melbourne architect, Peter Elliott, in the design of the Spencer Street Footbridge in 1999.

== Awards ==
The Melbourne Convention Centre was awarded the Australian Construction Achievement Award in 2010.

The Melbourne Exhibition Centre was awarded the Sir Zelman Cowen Award for Public Architecture in 1996.

Melbourne Convention and Exhibition Centre was Gold as the state’s best venue in the VTIC Victorian Tourism Awards

Premier's Sustainability Awards 2018 - Government category for Melbourne Energy Renewable Project.

Australian Business Awards - Employer of Choice 2018 and 2017.

== Notable events ==
=== Melbourne Art Fair ===
The inaugural Melbourne Art Fair, a commercial art fair, was held in 1988 in the Royal Exhibition Building, started by a group of gallery-owners. It continued as a biennial event, exhibiting works from Australian and international galleries, with sales of A$8−10 million, from 2003 being run by the new not-for-profit Melbourne Art Foundation. The fair was paused in 2016 owing to lack of interest from galleries, but relaunched in a smaller form in a temporary venue in Southbank.

In 2020 it moved to its permanent new home at the Melbourne Convention and Exhibition Centre, with the aim of showcasing both major galleries and "progressive young galleries". However, because of the COVID-19 pandemic in Australia, its scheduled run in June 2020 had to be instead changed into on online version, running 1–7 June and showing artworks from the Asia-Pacific region from 40 galleries. The next fair is scheduled for 17–20 February 2022.

The fair is endorsed by the Art Galleries Association of Australia (AAGA) and is supported by the federal government via the Australia Council for the Arts and the Government of Victoria via Creative Victoria.

=== PAX Australia ===
The first international edition of gaming exhibition and festival Penny Arcade Expo (PAX) was held in 2013 at the Melbourne Showgrounds.

Shortly following the hugely successful inaugural event, it was announced that the 2014 edition would be held at the Melbourne Convention and Exhibition Centre. The MCEC has since become the permanent home of PAX Australia, with the event held annually in either October or November (with the exception of the scheduled 2020 and 2021 shows due to the COVID-19 pandemic, with the events being held online instead). In 2022, a reported 23,000 people attended the event.

PAX has coincided with GCAP and Melbourne International Games Week since 2014, which is supported by the Government of Victoria via Creative Victoria. It is currently the only PAX outside of the US.

=== Connect Expo ===
Connect Expo, the annual Australian business and ICT trade show is held at the Melbourne Convention and Exhibition Center since 2014.

=== Other events ===
- Tanya Chua - Lemuria World Tour - 15 October 2017
- Joker Xue - Skyscraper World Tour - 1 April 2019
- Blockade IMARC - 29 to 31 October 2019
- JoJo Siwa - D.R.E.A.M. The Tour - 16 to 18 January 2020
- Planetshakers - Planetshakers Conference Melbourne 2023 - 12 to 14 January 2023
- A-Mei-ASMR World Tour – 28 July 2023
- Bini - Signals World Tour 2026 - 20 September 2026

== Gallery ==
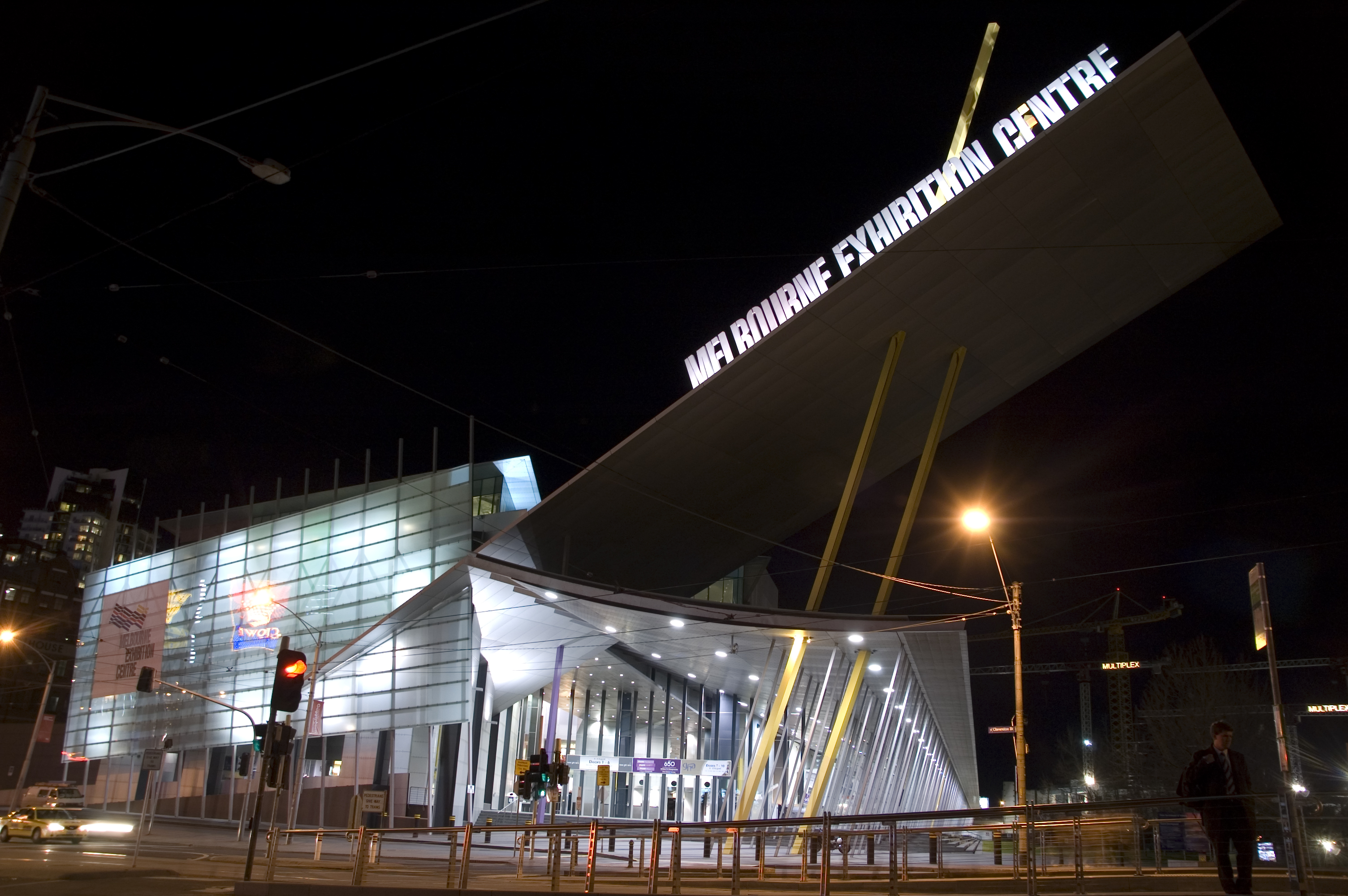
Melbourne Exhibition Centre viewed from Crown Casino. The new convention centre can be seen under construction in the background.

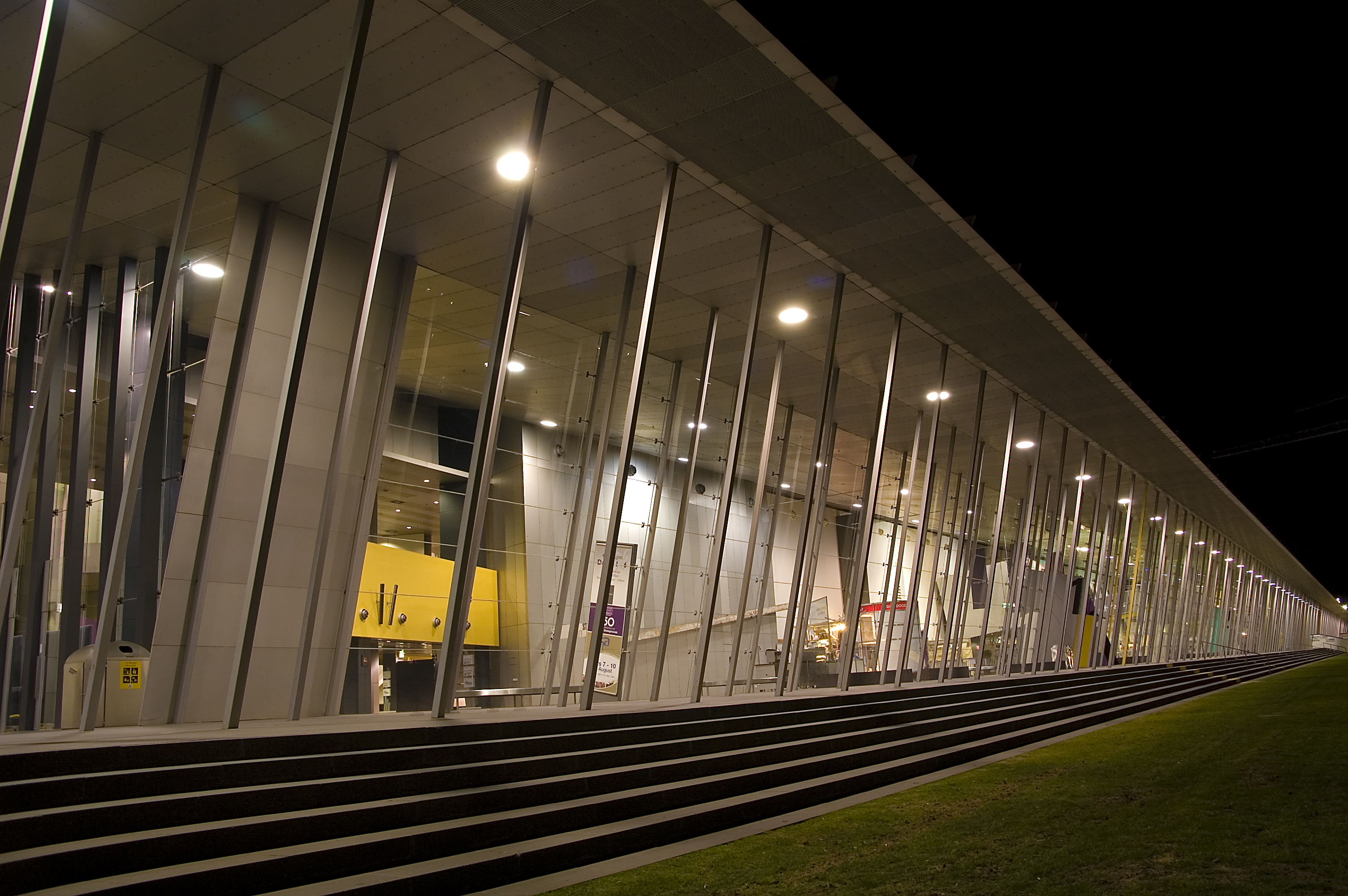
The Melbourne Exhibition Centre as viewed from the side

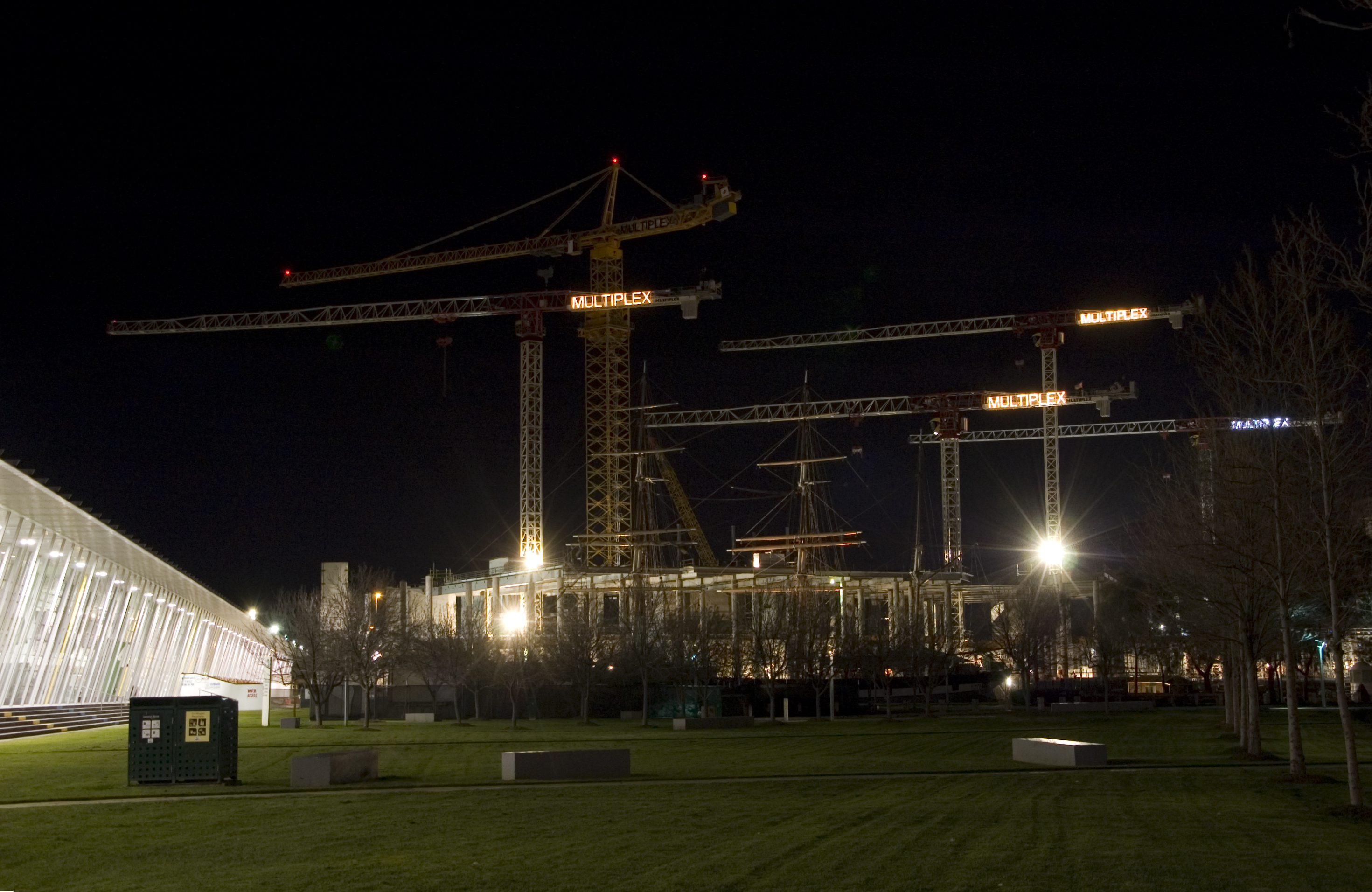
Melbourne Convention Centre under construction

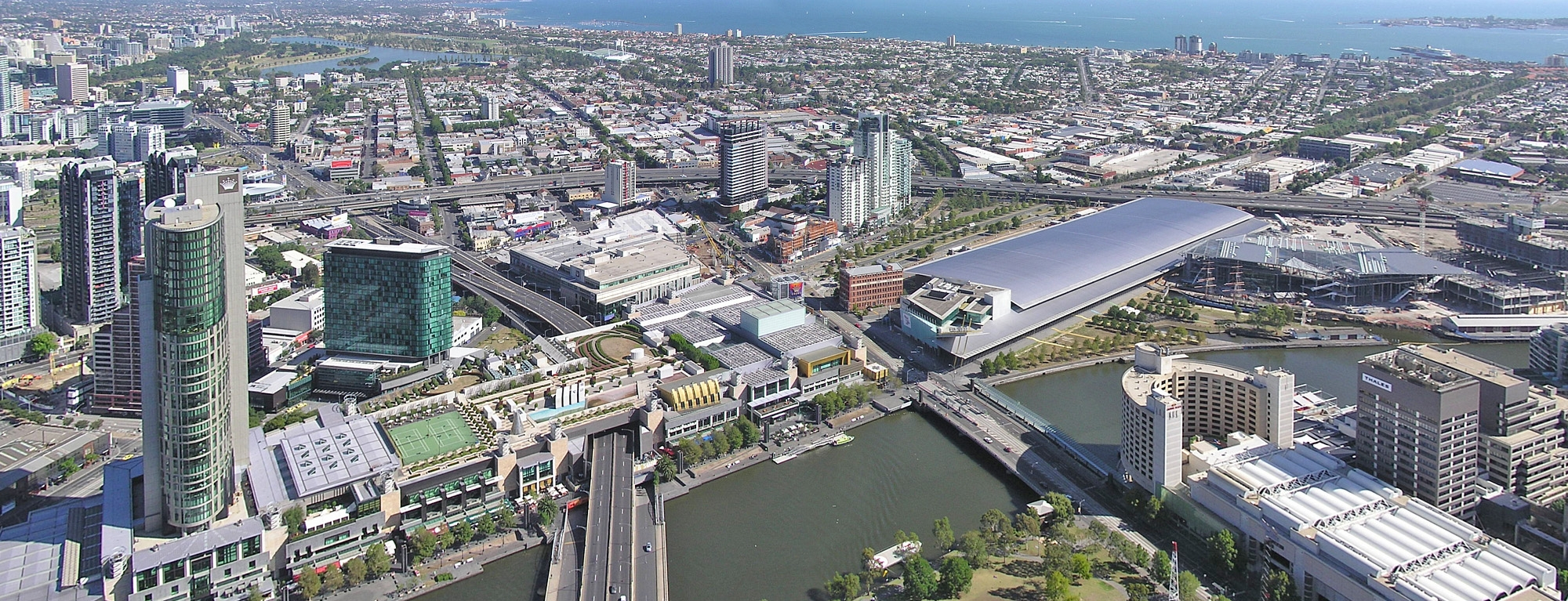
Overview of Melbourne Convention and Exhibition Centre

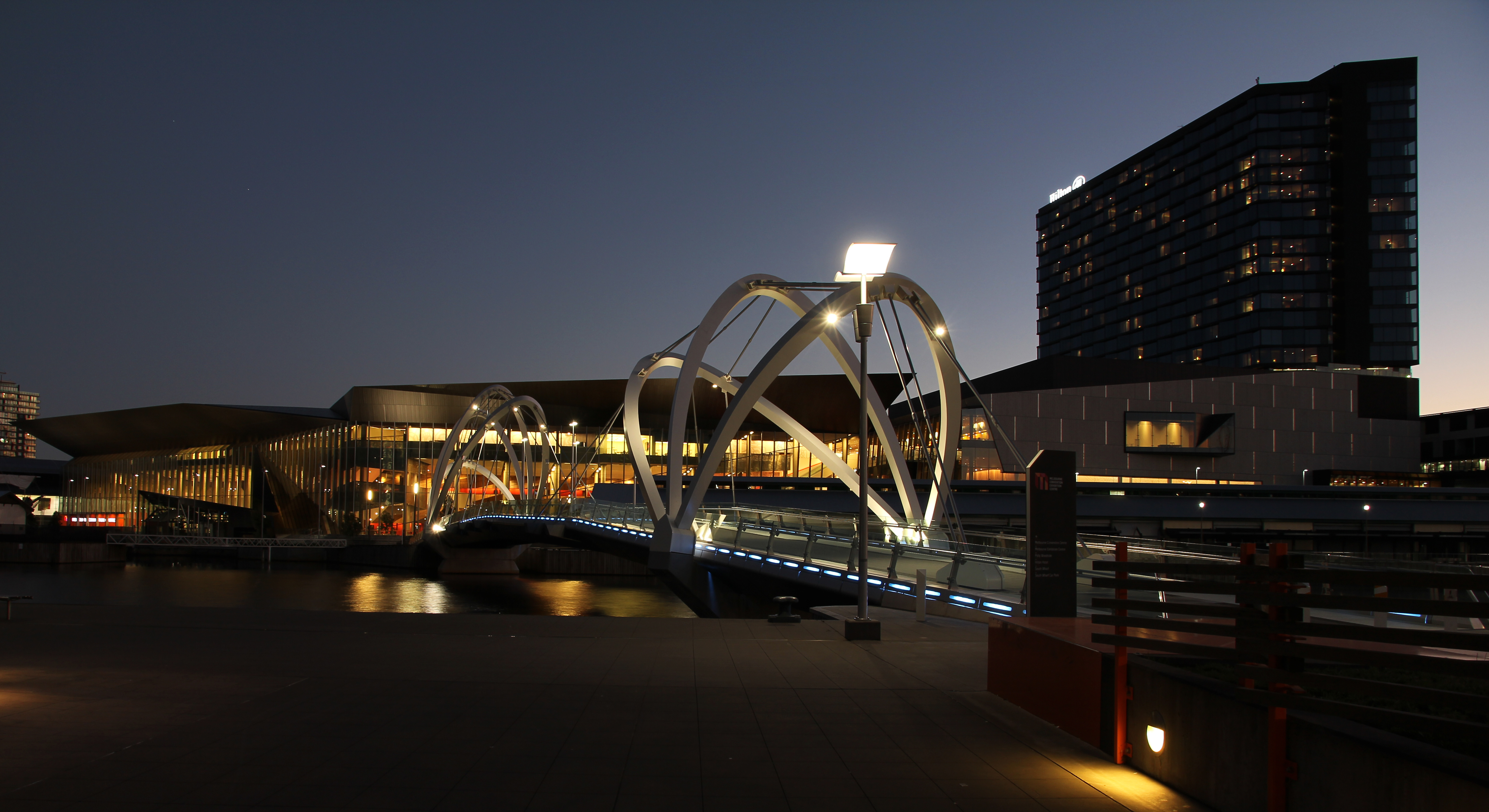
South Wharf and Melbourne Convention and Exhibition Centre

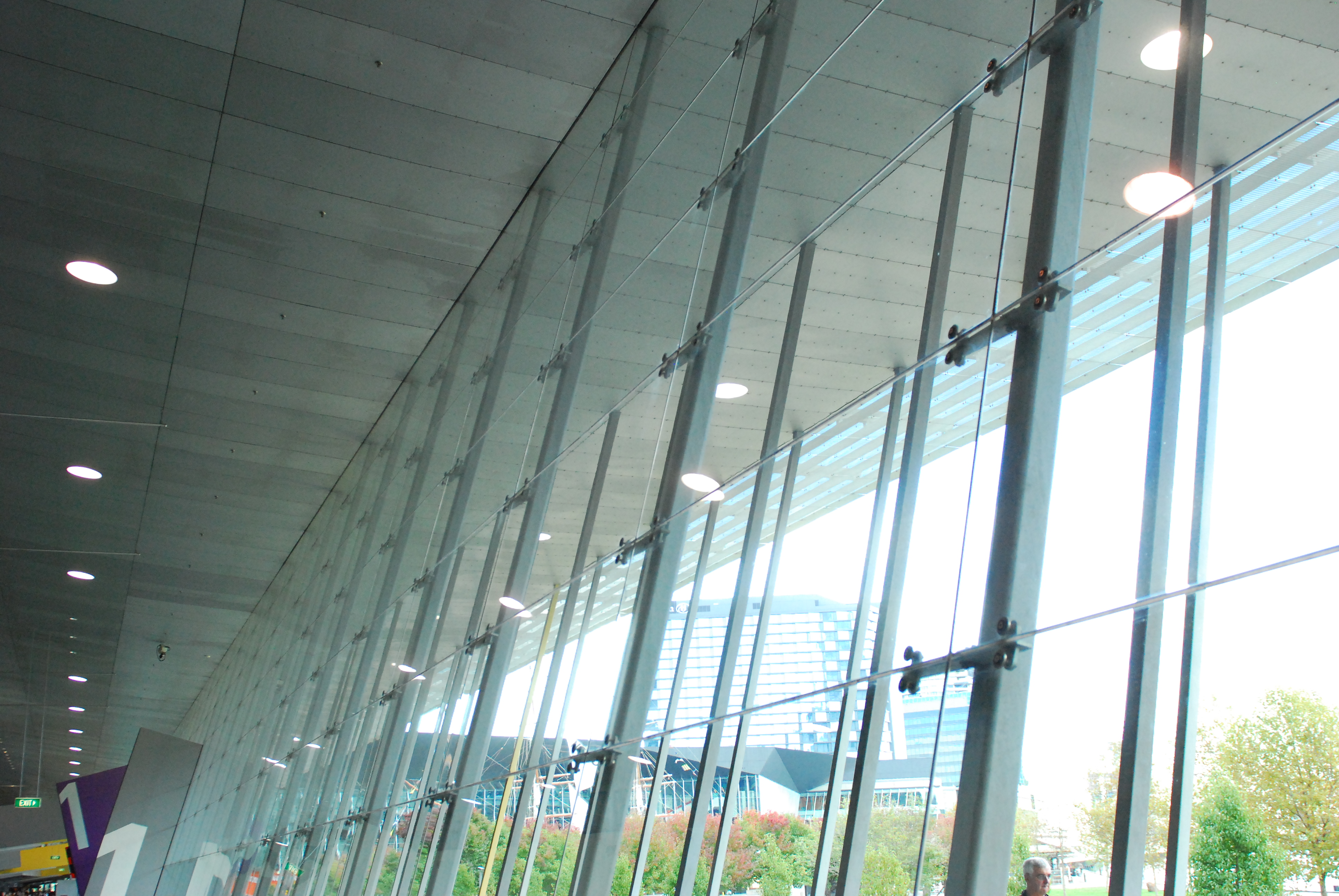
Melbourne Exhibition Centre glazing

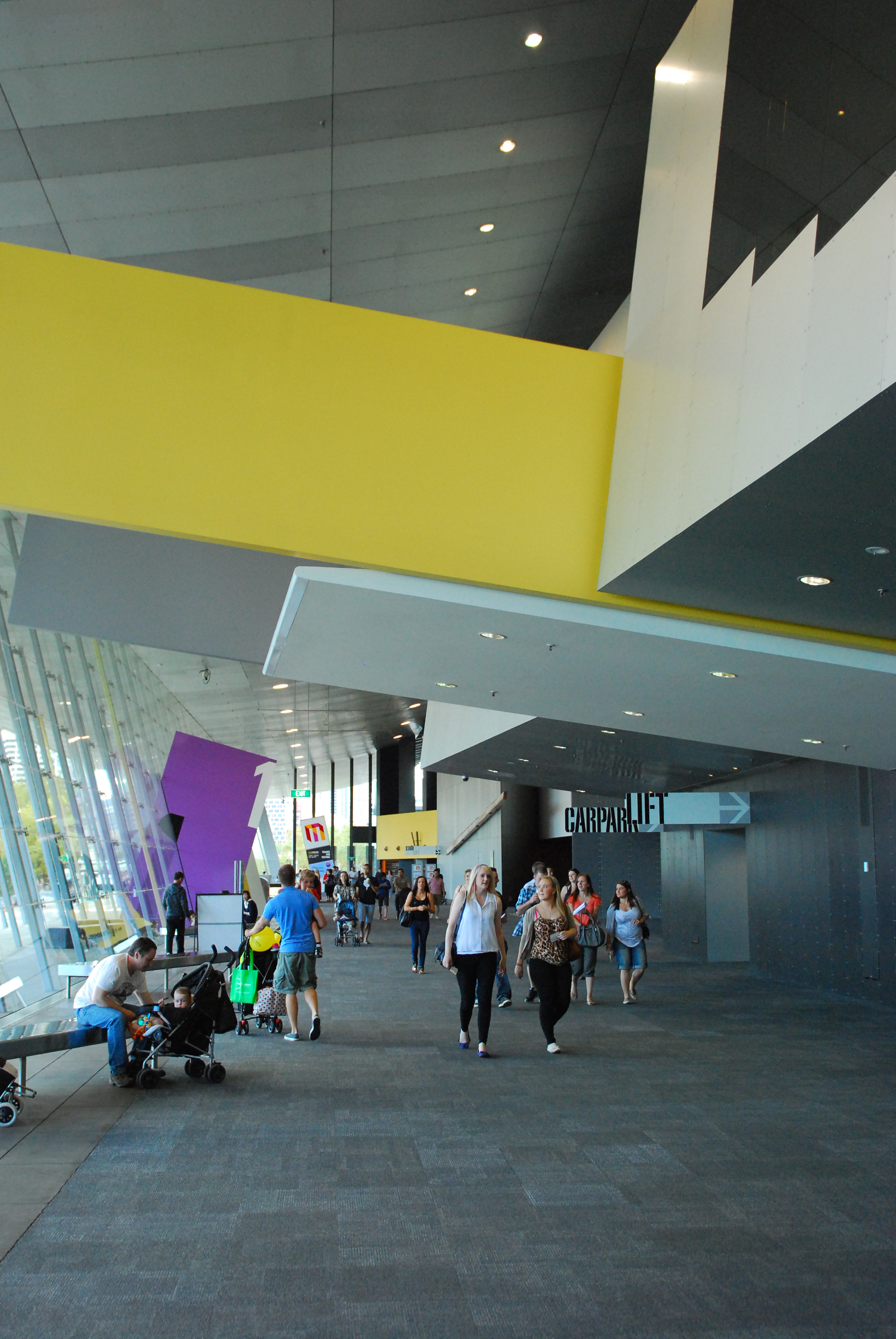
Melbourne Exhibition Centre Mezzanine balcony viewed through the concourse

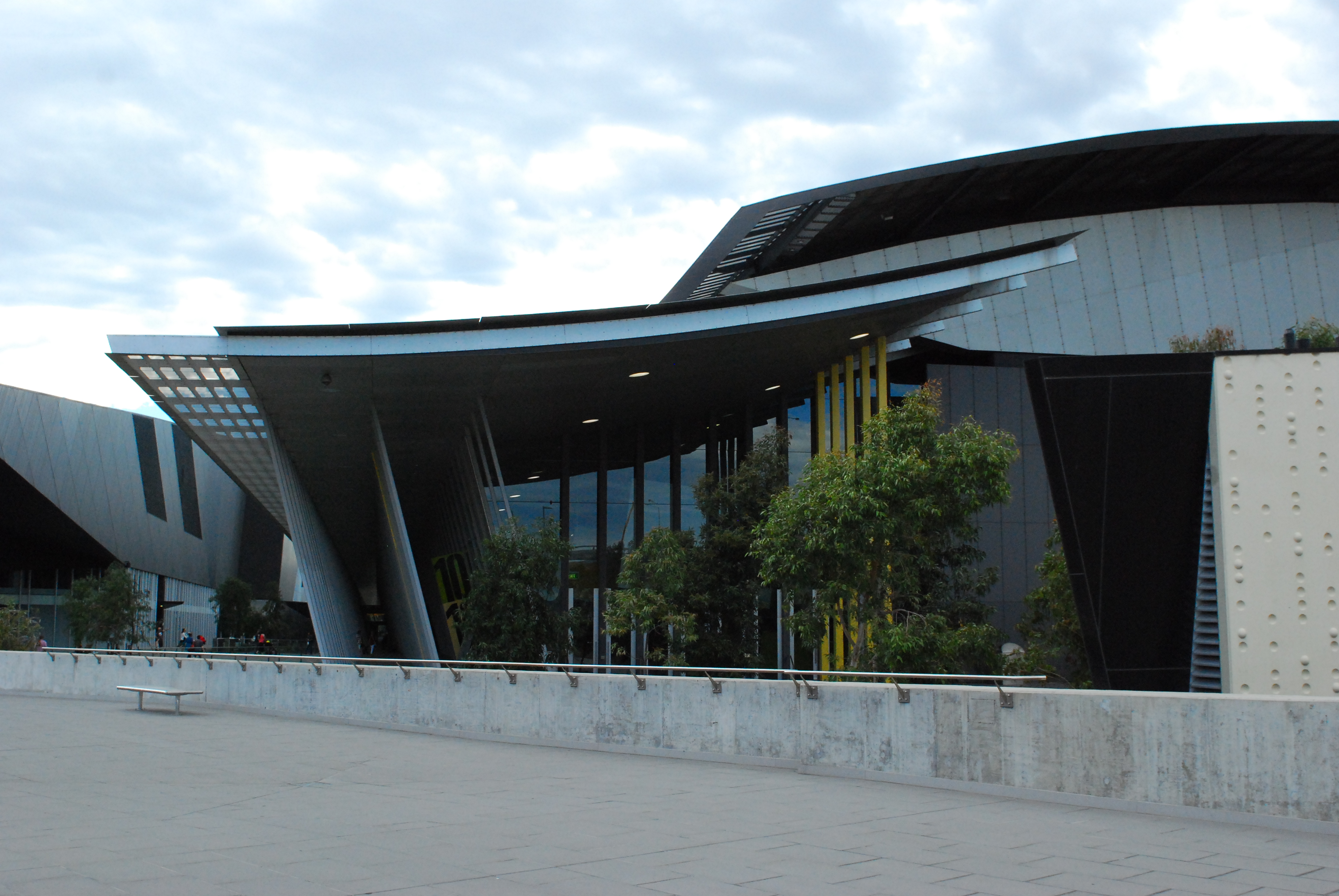
Melbourne Exhibition Centre two roofs view from north to south

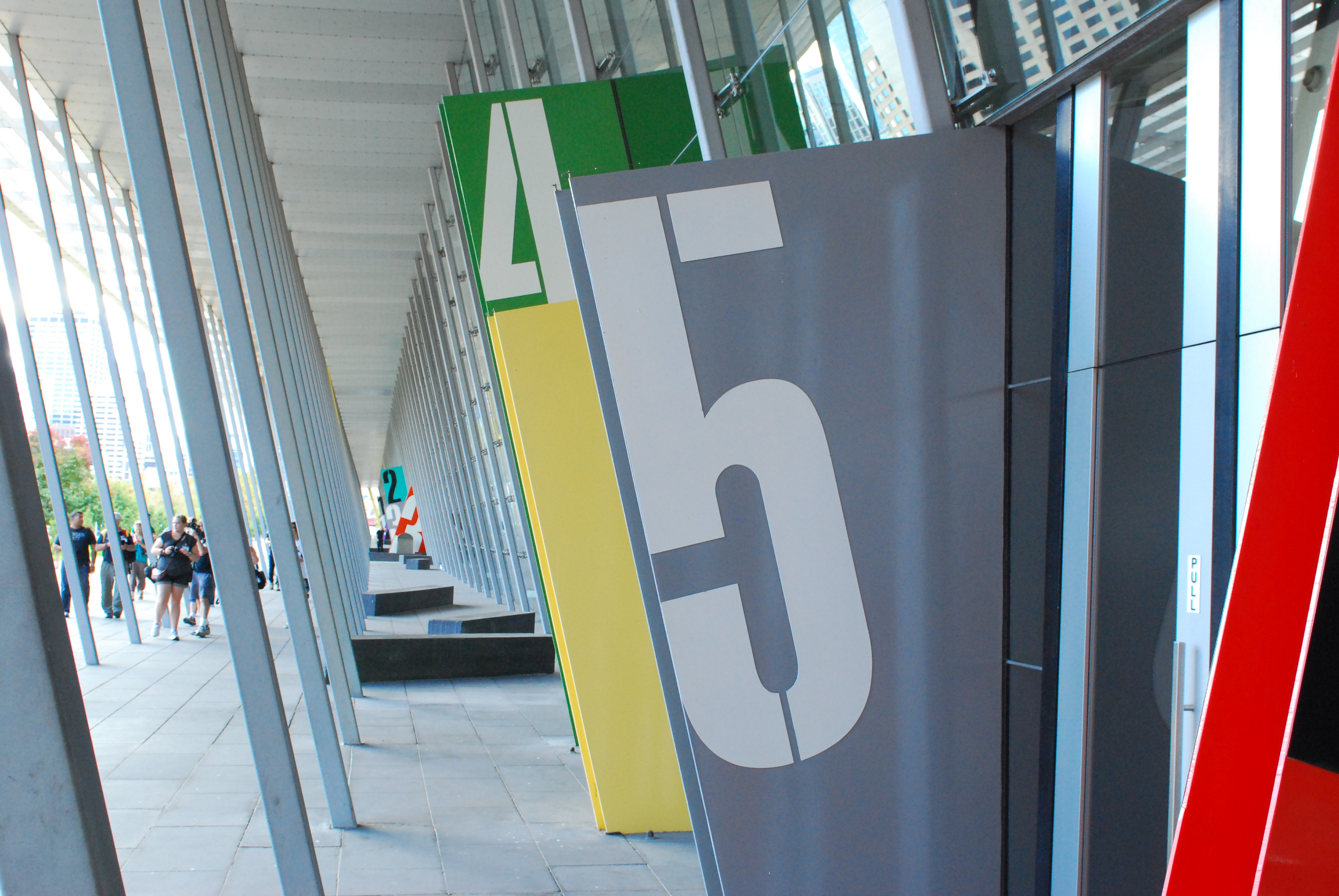
Melbourne Exhibition Centre stencilled door numbers

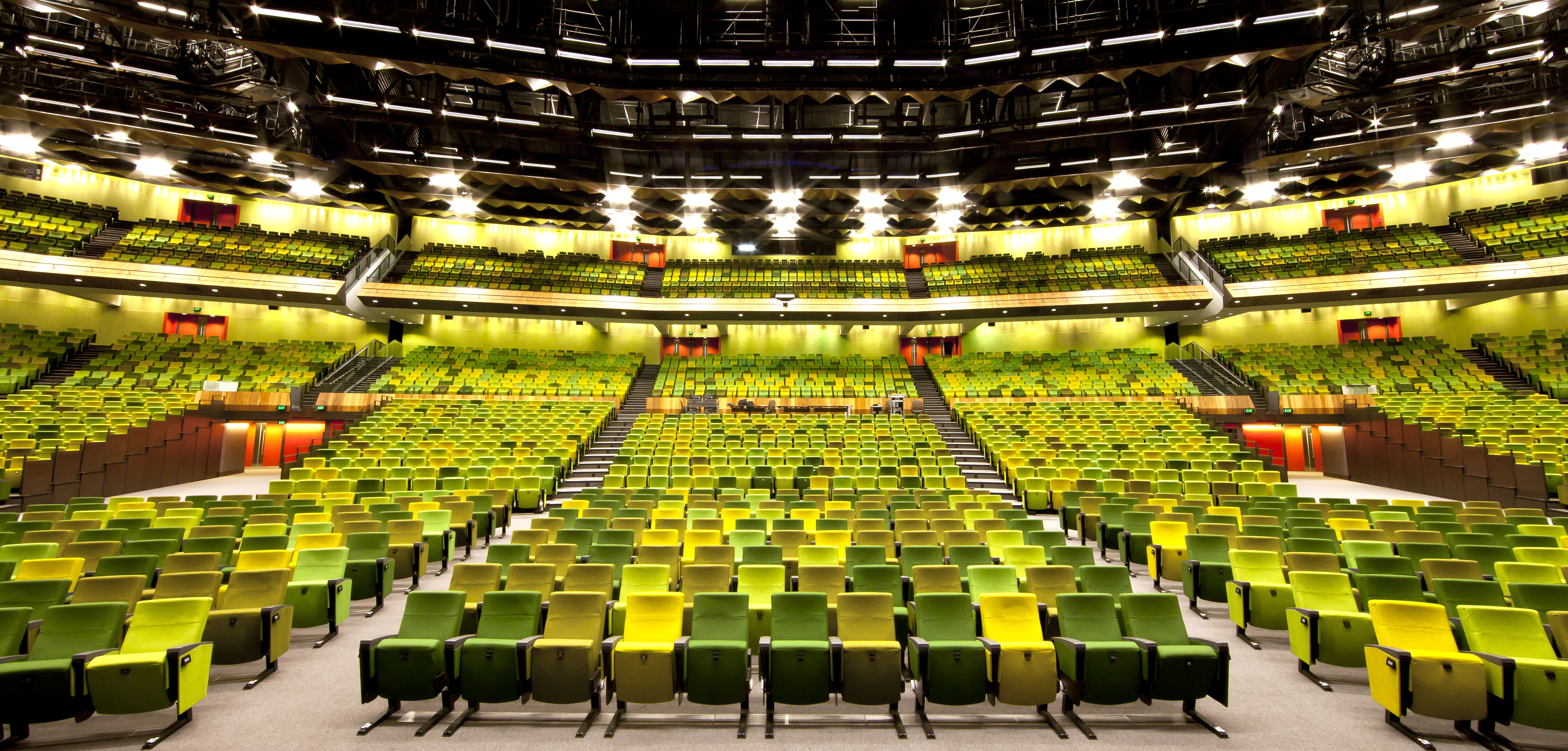
Hall interior

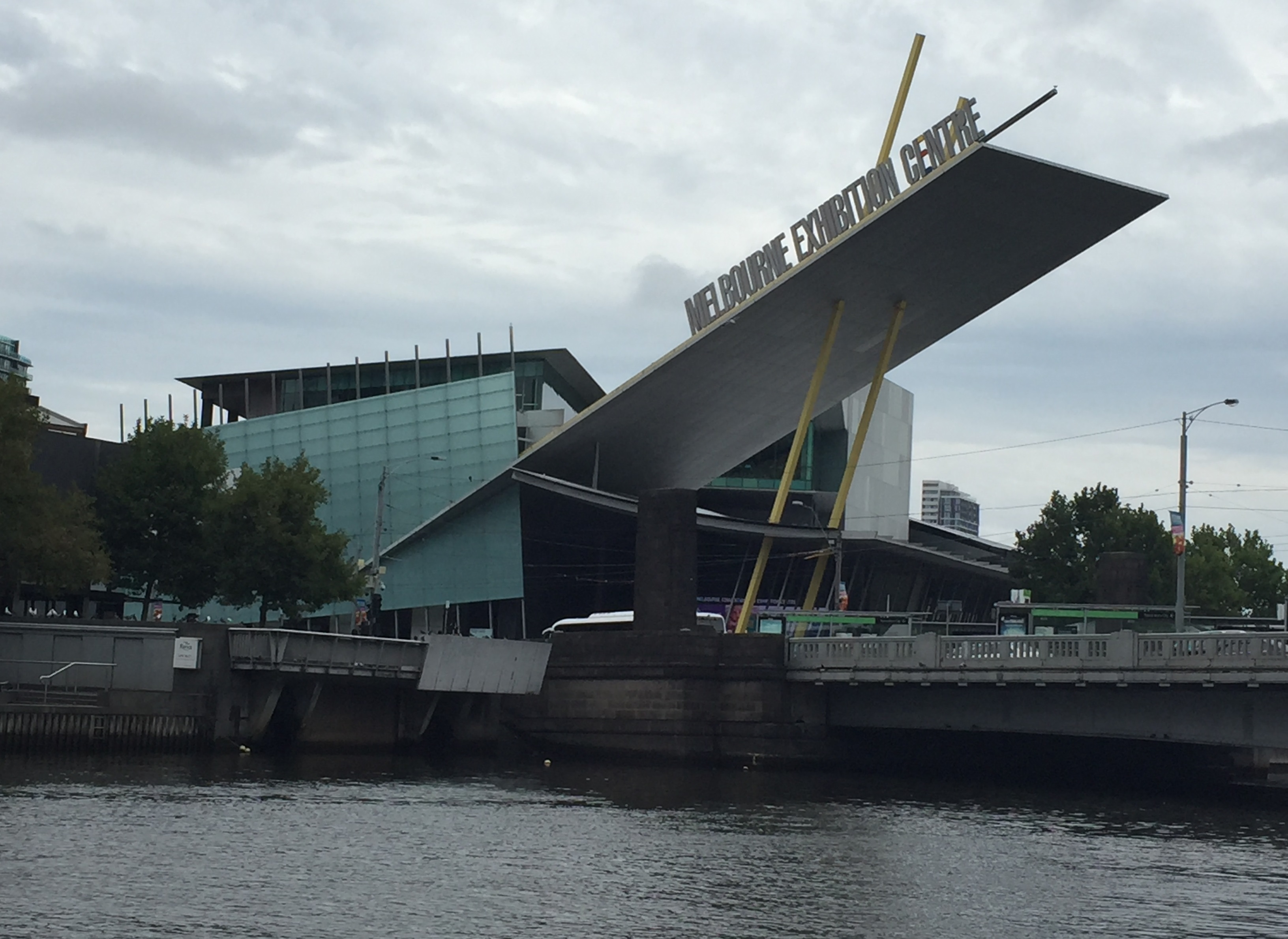
Melbourne Convention Centre viewed from the Yarra River on 9 February 2018

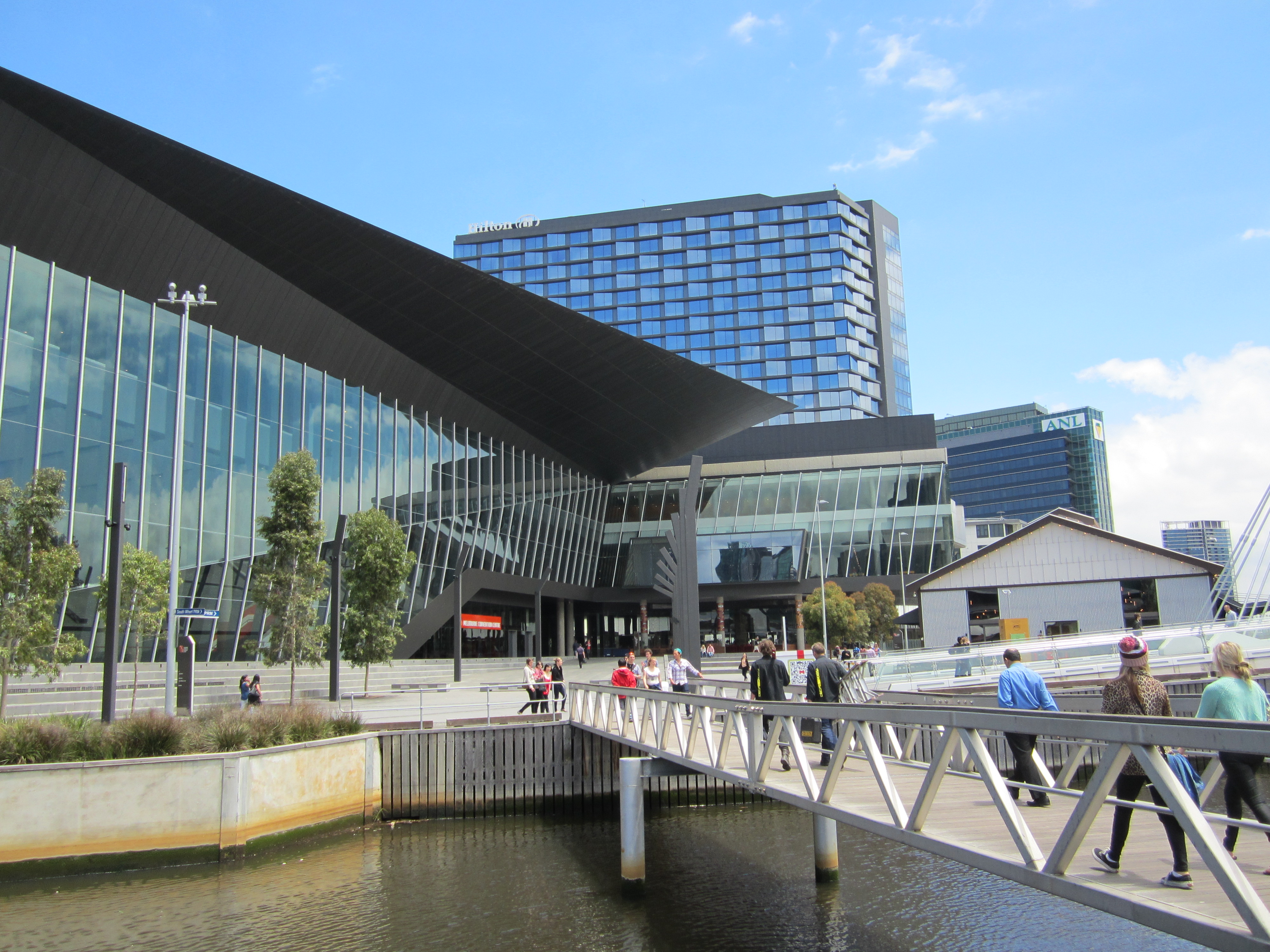
The Melbourne Convention Centre in December 2012

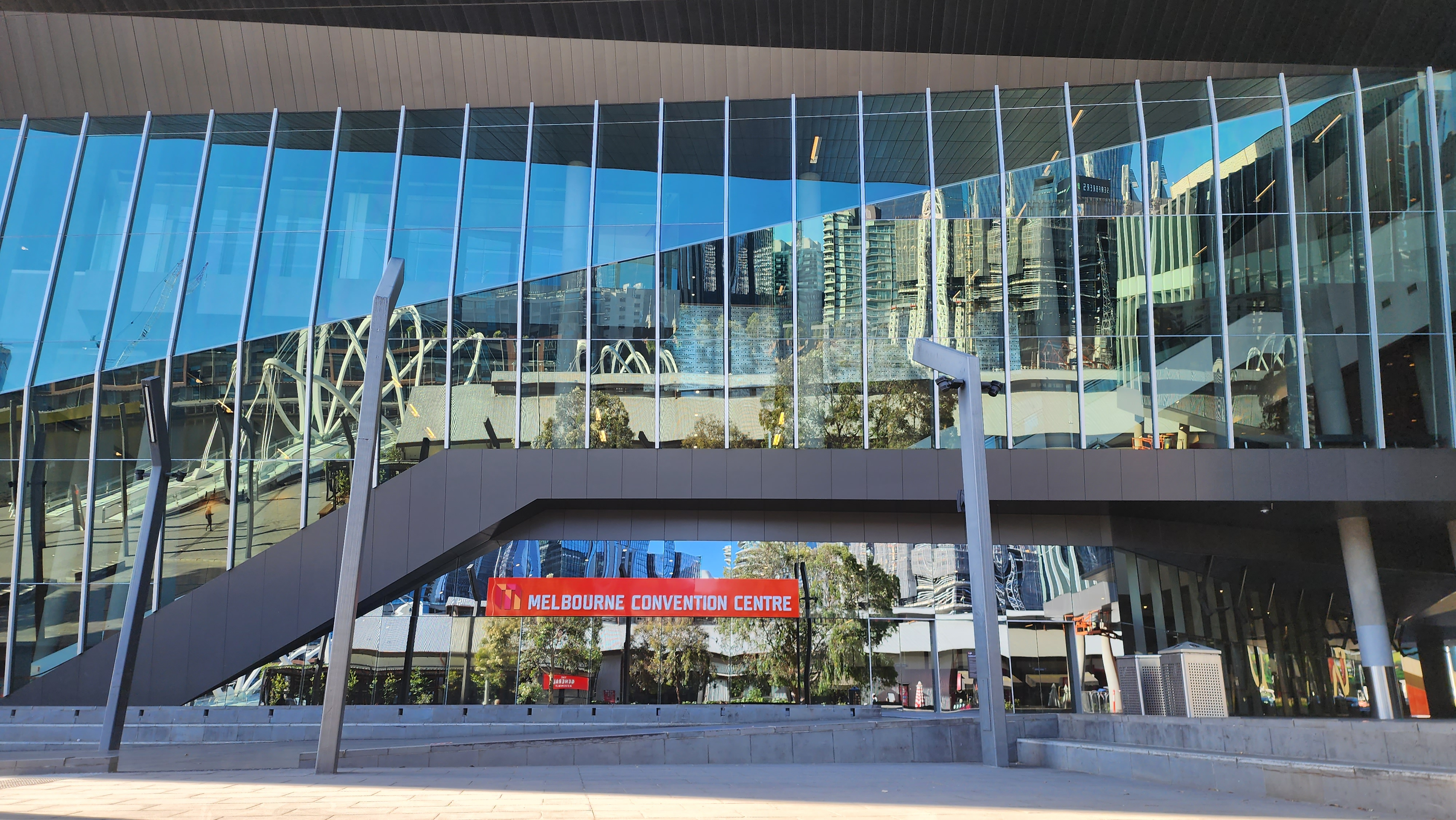
Melbourne Convention Centre front view
