= Microsoft Baseline Security Analyzer =

Computer security evaluation tool

- Screenshot of Microsoft Baseline Security Analyzer analysis result
- Developer: Microsoft
- Release: 16 August 2004
- Stable release: 2.3 / 9 January 2015
- Operating system: Windows 7, Windows Server 2008, Windows Vista, Windows Server 2003, Windows XP and Windows 2000
- Platform: IA-32 and x86-64
- Size: 1.5 ~ 1.7 MB
- Available in: English, German, French and Japanese
- Type: Computer security
- License: Freeware
- Website: technet.microsoft.com/en-us/security/cc184924.aspx

Microsoft Baseline Security Analyzer (MBSA) is a discontinued software tool that is no longer available from Microsoft that determines security state by assessing missing security updates and less-secure security settings within Microsoft Windows, Windows components such as Internet Explorer, IIS web server, and products Microsoft SQL Server, and Microsoft Office macro settings. Security updates are determined by the current version of MBSA using the Windows Update Agent present on Windows computers since Windows 2000 Service Pack 3. The less-secure settings, often called Vulnerability Assessment (VA) checks, are assessed based on a hard-coded set of registry and file checks. An example of a VA might be that permissions for one of the directories in the /www/root folder of IIS could be set at too low a level, allowing unwanted modification of files from outsiders. MBSA was written by Mark Shavlik working in partnership with Microsoft.

== Version history ==
Versions 1.2.1 and below run on NT4, Windows 2000, Windows XP, and Windows Server 2003, provide support for IIS versions 5 through 6, SQL Server 7 and 2000, Internet Explorer 5.01 and 6.0 only, and Microsoft Office 2000 through 2003. Security update assessment is provided by an integrated version of Shavlik's HFNetChk 3.8 scan tool. MBSA 1.2.1 was localized into English, German, French and Japanese versions and supported security assessment for any locale.

Version 2.0 retained the hard-coded VA checks, but replaced the Shavlik security assessment engine with Microsoft Update technologies that add dynamic support for all Microsoft products supported by Microsoft Update. MBSA 2.0.1 was released to support the revised Windows Update (WU) offline scan file (WSUSSCN2.CAB). MBSA 2.1 added Vista and Windows Server 2008 support, a new Vista-styled GUI interface, support for the latest Windows Update Agent (3.0), a new Remote Directory (/rd) feature and extended the VA checks to x64 platforms.

In the August 2012 Security Bulletin Webcast Q&A on Technet it was announced that "The current version of MBSA (2.2) will not support Windows 8 and Microsoft currently has no plans to release an updated version of the tool."

In November 2013 MBSA 2.3 was released. This release adds support for Windows 8, Windows 8.1, Windows Server 2012, and Windows Server 2012 R2. Windows 2000 will no longer be supported with this release.

Microsoft support and updates for MBSA has ended. The current version 2.3 does not offer official support for Windows 10 or Windows Server 2016. The Microsoft MBSA webpage has been removed.

== How MBSA differs from Microsoft Update ==
MBSA only scans for 3 classes of updates, security updates, service packs and update rollups. Critical and optional updates are left aside.

== See also ==
- Belarc Advisor
