= Ivanti =

American IT software company

- Type: Private
- Industry: IT security and systems management software
- Founded: 1985
- Headquarters: South Jordan, Utah, U.S.
- Area served: Worldwide
- Key people: Jeff Abbott, Board Member; Dennis Kozak, CEO; Peter De Bock, CFO; Karl Triebes, CPO
- Revenue: ▲US$1 billion (2023)
- Number of employees: 3070 (2023)
- Website: www.ivanti.com

Ivanti (/ˌiːˈvɒntiː/) is an IT software company headquartered in South Jordan, Utah, United States. It produces software for IT Security, IT Service Management (ITSM), IT Asset Management (ITAM), Unified Endpoint Management (UEM), Identity Management, Patch Management and supply chain management. It was formed in January 2017 with the merger of LANDESK and HEAT Software, and later acquired Cherwell Software. The company became more widely known after security incidents related to the VPN hardware it sells.

== History ==
=== LANDESK ===
LAN Systems was founded in 1985 and its software products acquired by Intel in 1991 to form its LANDESK division. LANDESK introduced the desktop management category in 1993. In 2002 LANDESK Software became a standalone company with headquarters near Salt Lake City, Utah. In 2006, Avocent purchased the company for $416 million. Also in 2006, LANDESK added process management technologies to its product line and extended into the consolidated service desk market with LANDESK Service Desk. In 2009 Avocent was acquired by Emerson. In 2010 LANDESK was acquired by private equity firm Thoma Bravo from Emerson.

LANDESK bought supply chain software company Wavelink in 2012, network vulnerability assessment and patch management company Shavlik in 2013, application software company Naurtech Corporation in 2014, data visualisation company Xtraction Solutions in 2015. and AppSense, a provider of secure user environment management technology, in 2016.

=== Lumension Security ===
Lumension Security, Inc was founded as High Tech Software in 1991 and headquartered in Scottsdale, Arizona The company was rebranded as PatchLink Corporation in 1999. In 2006, Patrick Clawson was appointed chairman, CEO and president The company then adopted the Lumension name in 2007.

In 2009 Lumension acquired Securityworks, and in 2012 acquired CoreTrace.

Lumension products traditionally competed in the endpoint management and security industry against Sophos, McAfee, Kaspersky Lab, Symantec and Trend Micro among others.

=== HEAT ===
HEAT software was a producer of software for IT Service Management and Endpoint Management formed in 2015 by the merger of FrontRange Solutions and Lumension Security.

=== Ivanti ===
In January 2017 Clearlake Capital, owner of HEAT Software, purchased LANDESK from Thoma Bravo. On January 23, 2017, LANDESK and HEAT Software merged to form Ivanti. The combined company has 1,800 employees in 23 countries and markets some products with references to their original names such as Wavelink supply chain software and Ivanti patch product ‘powered by Shavlik’.

On April 12, 2017, Ivanti acquired Concorde Solutions, a UK based Software Asset Management company. In July 2017, Ivanti acquired RES Software, a US and Netherlands based company producing automation and identity management software. Later merged in 2018 into the Workspace Manager product.

In September 2020, Ivanti entered into an agreement to acquire US based Unified Endpoint Management company MobileIron for $872 million and San Jose, California based Pulse Secure, for undisclosed terms. On December 1, 2020, Ivanti announced those acquisitions completed.

On January 26, 2021, Ivanti announced the intent to acquire Cherwell Software.

On August 2, 2021, Ivanti acquired RiskSense, a pioneer in risk-based vulnerability management and prioritization, to drive the next evolution of patch management.

== Controversies ==
=== 2021 Pulse Connect Secure hack ===
On April 20, 2021, cybersecurity firm FireEye reported that hackers with suspected Chinese government ties exploited Pulse Secure VPN to break into government agencies, defense companies and financial institutions in Europe and the US. The report detailed how hackers repeatedly took advantage of several known and one novel flaw in Pulse Secure VPN to gain access to dozens of organizations in the defense industrial sector. The US Department of Homeland Security confirmed the intrusions in a public advisory, urging network administrators to scan for signs of compromise. Ivanti published an emergency workaround which DHS urged network admins to install. The Cybersecurity and Infrastructure Security Agency ordered federal civilian agencies to take several steps to reduce risk from the suspected breach. FireEye reported that some of the intrusions using the vulnerabilities began as early as August 2020, conducted by those with suspected ties to the Chinese government. There were similarities between the hack and intrusions in 2014 and 2015 conducted by a Chinese espionage actor named APT5. After further examination, CISA discovered that at least 5 federal agencies had been breached, among 24 agencies that use the Pulse Connect Secure products.

According to a February 2026 Bloomberg report, Ivanti had discovered the breach as early as February 2021, two months before FireEye's public disclosure. The hackers had planted a backdoor that allowed them to compromise 119 unnamed organisations using the same VPN product. Mandiant had also been aware of the intrusions, having alerted Ivanti that hackers exploited the vulnerability to breach European and U.S. military contractors. Bloomberg's reporting linked the scale of the breach in part to rounds of layoffs under Clearlake Capital Group's ownership of Ivanti, particularly in 2022, which affected employees with deep institutional knowledge of the company's products and their security.

== Other incidents ==
In January 2024, Chinese government hackers were reported to have targeted Ivanti software to break into other organizations.
