= Virtual Desktop Extender =

Virtual Desktop Extender is a proven technology to extend a remote desktop with local applications. The technology merges local applications seamlessly into a remote desktop, hosted with Citrix XenApp, Citrix XenDesktop, Microsoft Remote Desktop Services, VMware View.

The local applications are merged in the remote desktop, and remote taskbar.

Virtual Desktop Extender technology will automatically populate the local applications into the remote start menu. The end user can simply select an application and the Virtual Desktop Extender technology will launch the local application and present the local application seamless in the remote desktop. This makes desktop environments such as VDI or RDS more viable for a larger group of users within organizations.

The local applications are running locally and use local resources.

Virtual Desktop Extender (VDX) technology is also referred to as 'subscribed applications', and 'reverse seamless windows'.

== History ==
Virtual Desktop Extender technology was introduced by RES Software under the name 'RES Subscriber'. Citrix has started an initiative called 'Project Alice' to demonstrate reverse seamless windows with Citrix XenApp.

In 2017, Ivanti acquired RES Software.

In 2018, the product was merged with the Workspace Manager product.
