= Cherwell Software =

American technology company

- Type: Subsidiary
- Industry: Enterprise software
- Founded: 2004
- Founder: Vance Brown; Arlen S. Feldman; Timothy G. Pfeifer
- Headquarters: Colorado Springs, Colorado
- Key people: Sam Gilliland (CEO)
- Products: Cherwell IT Service Management Enterprise Service Management Project and Portfolio Management Facilities Solution HR Service Management
- Services: IT Service Management; IT Asset Management
- Parent: Ivanti
- Website: www.ivanti.com/company/history/cherwell
- Footnotes; As of February 2019

Cherwell Software, LLC, was a privately held American technology company specializing in IT service management software. The company headquarters is in Colorado Springs, Colorado. It also has offices in Swindon, UK. The company name is taken from the River Cherwell, which runs through Northamptonshire and Oxfordshire, England.

== History ==
Cherwell was founded in 2004 by Vance Brown, a former CEO of GoldMine Software (later, a product by Ivanti), Arlen S. Feldman and Timothy G. Pfeifer. Cherwell announced their first product in 2007.

=== Venture capital ===
In November 2012, Cherwell received a $25 million investment from Insight Venture Partners. The investment was highly unusual for the industry: in exchange for their capital investment, Insight Venture was only granted common stock in the company and did not receive control over day-to-day operations. CEO Vance Brown told the media that he did not want to worry about having an exit strategy.

In January 2013, the Service Desk Institute accredited Cherwell service management.

On February 27, 2017, Cherwell secured a $50 million investment from investment firm Kohlberg Kravis Roberts (KKR). In January 2018, Craig Harper resigned as CEO, and was replaced by Vance Brown on an interim basis. On April 4, 2018, an additional $172 million investment from KKR included acquiring much of the Insight Venture Partner stake, made them a majority owner. In August 2018, Brown left to lead the National Cybersecurity Center, and Sam Gilliland became chief executive.

On June 4, 2020, Cherwell announced Rob Salvagno of KKR and Drew Harman of Insight Venture Partners joined their board. Dave Welsh from KKR, a board member since 2018 became chairman. In January 2021, Ivanti announced it would acquire Cherwell for undisclosed terms.

== Products ==
The Cherwell Service Management platform (CSM) is a suite of IT service management applications. Cherwell developed and sells applications designed with Information Technology Infrastructure Library (ITIL) methodology. Cherwell Service Management 5.0 was released in September 2014 and 6.0 in August 2015. Products include: incident management, problem management, change management, release management, knowledge management, service level management, asset management, service catalog management, service request fulfillment and project management.

CSM server is available only for Microsoft Windows as is the main client interface.

Cherwell developed mobile applications for iOS and Android but they have since been retired as of September 2019. StrataCom Inc., a Cherwell partner, released a Cherwell mobile app and Kanban boards for Cherwell shortly after this.

Cherwell develops Express Software Manager for IT asset management and software asset management.
