= AppSense =

Software company in United Kingdom

- Founded: 1999; 27 years ago
- Founder: Charles Sharland
- Successor: Ivanti (2016)
- Headquarters: Sunnyvale, California; Daresbury, England
- Number of locations: 23 countries
- Area served: California; New York City; England
- Products: virtualization technology

AppSense was a company that provided virtual user/desktop infrastructure. It was acquired by Ivanti (then called LANDESK) in 2016. AppSense offered virtual user environments for enterprise desktop infrastructure, from user rights management to personalization settings.

== History ==
AppSense was founded in 1999 by Charles Sharland.

In February 2011, AppSense announced a $70 million round of funding from Goldman Sachs for a minority share in the company. Originally based in Daresbury, England, in 2010 AppSense opened a US headquarters in New York City, with a Technology and Development center located in Sunnyvale, California. The company relocated its headquarters to Sunnyvale, California from New York City in 2013.

In May 2010, AppSense was mentioned for use with Citrix systems. In 2010, AppSense joined the Microsoft System Center Alliance, and is an ISV Partner. In May 2011, AppSense announced a partnership with Cisco.

In March 2016 AppSense was acquired by LANDESK. In 2017, LANDESK and HEAT Software were merged to create a new software company called Ivanti.
