= Mungo =

Mungo may refer to:

== People ==
- Mungo (name), a list of people with the given name or surname
- Mungo people, an ethnic group in Cameroon

== Places ==
- Mungo, Angola, a town and municipality
- Mungo National Park, Australia
- Lake Mungo, Australia
- Mungo River, Cameroon
- Mungo River, New Zealand

== Other uses ==
- Mungo bean
- Mungo ESK, an armoured transport vehicle used by the German Army
- Mungo, an oil field in the North Sea
- Mungo, a fictional character from the animated television series Heathcliff
- Mungo, a fibrous woollen material generated from waste fabric

== See also ==
- Mungo Man and Mungo Woman, names of two sets of prehistoric human remains found in Australia - see Lake Mungo remains
- John Mungo-Park (1918–1941), British fighter pilot
- Mungo Jerry, a 1970s British rock group
- Mungos, a mongoose genus
- Mongo (disambiguation)
- St. Mungo's (disambiguation)
- Moengo, Suriname, a town
- Moungo (department), Cameroon
