= Mongolism =

Mongolism may refer to:

- Pan-Mongolism, an irredentist idea advocating the union of the contiguous territories inhabited by Mongols
- Mongolian idiocy, outdated term for Down syndrome
- Mongoloid, populations that show certain phenotypic traits

== See also ==
- Mongolian nationalism (disambiguation)
- Mongolian studies
- Mong (disambiguation)
- Mongo (disambiguation)
- Mongoloid (disambiguation)
- Mongols (disambiguation)
