= Mungo River =

The Mungo River may refer to:

- Mungo River, Cameroon
- Mungo River, New Zealand

== See also ==
- Mungo (disambiguation)
