= Greater Mongolia =

Greater Mongolia may refer to:

- In Pan-Mongolism, idea that advocates cultural and political solidarity of Mongols
- The Mongol Empire, sometimes referred to as the Great Mongol Empire or Great Mongolia
- The Mongol heartland, the contiguous geographical area in which the Mongols primarily live

== See also ==
- Mongolia (disambiguation)
- Eastern Mongols (disambiguation)
- Northern Mongols (disambiguation)
- Upper Mongols
- Oirats
- Inner Mongolia
