= Mongolian =

Mongolian may refer to:

- Something of, from, or related to Mongolia, a country in Asia
- Mongolian people, or Mongols
- Bogd Khanate of Mongolia, the government of Mongolia, 1911–1919 and 1921–1924
- Mongolian language
- Mongolian script
- Mongolian writing systems
- Mongolian (Unicode block)
- Mongolian cuisine
- Mongolian culture

== Other uses ==
- Mongolian idiocy, now more commonly referred to as Down syndrome

== See also ==
- Languages of Mongolia
- List of Mongolians
- Mongolian nationalism (disambiguation)
- Mongolian race (disambiguation)
- Mongoloid (disambiguation)
