= Sarry =

Sarry may refer to:

- Sarry, Marne, a commune in the French region of Champagne-Ardenne
- Sarry, Saône-et-Loire, a commune in the French region of Bourgogne
- Sarry, Yonne, a commune in the French region of Bourgogne
- Sarry, a nickname for the public house Saracen Head, Glasgow
