= Mong =

Mong may refer to:

== People ==
- A proposed original name for the Hmong people, based on the main group, the Mong community
- Bob Mong (fl. 1971–present), American journalist and academic administrator
- Henry Mong (fl. 1907–1924), American surgeon and Presbyterian missionary
- Mong Monichariya (fl. 1993–present), Cambodian judge
- Mong Thongdee (born c. 1997), Thai origami artist
- William Mong (1927–2010), Hong Kong businessman
- William V. Mong (1875–1940), American film actor, screenwriter and director
- MC Mong, stage name of South Korean hip hop artist Shin Dong-hyun (born 1979)

== Places ==
- Mong, Punjab, a town and Union Council in Pakistan
- Mong, Azad Kashmir, a town in Kashmir, Pakistan
- Mong Circle, a hereditary chiefdom in Bangladesh
- Mong, a hamlet in Rogaland, Norway

== Other uses ==
- Mong or Hmong language
- Mong, the ISO 15924 code for Mongolian script
- Mongolian idiocy, obsolete term for Down syndrome
