= List of listed buildings in Dunning, Perth and Kinross =

This is a list of listed buildings in the parish of Dunning in Perth and Kinross, Scotland.

== List ==
Name	Location	Date Listed	Grid Ref. (Note: Sometimes known as OSGB36, the grid reference (where provided) is based on the British national grid reference system used by the Ordnance Survey. • "Guide to National Grid". Ordnance Survey. • "Get-a-map". Ordnance Survey.)	Geo-coordinates	Notes	LB Number (Note: Historic Environment Scotland assign a unique alphanumeric identifier to each designated site in Scotland, for listed buildings this always begins with "LB", for example "LB12345".)	Image
Keltie Castle Bridge Over Keltie Burn				56°18′05″N 3°36′19″W	Category C(S)	5913	Upload Photo
'Dunglas', Chalmers Street				56°18′45″N 3°35′07″W	Category C(S)	5925	Upload Photo
'Glenannia', 'Harry's Muir', 'Blair Cottage', Upper Granco Street				56°18′45″N 3°35′05″W	Category C(S)	5934	Upload Photo
'Fonab' Lower Granco Street				56°18′47″N 3°35′09″W	Category C(S)	5937	Upload Photo
'Harlaw', Lower Granco Street				56°18′48″N 3°35′10″W	Category C(S)	5940	Upload Photo
Pitcairns House Including Gatepiers, Quadrant Walls And Boundary Walls To Forgandenny Road				56°18′34″N 3°34′25″W	Category B	5950	Upload Photo
St. John's Masonic Lodge, Yetts Of Muckhart Road, Including Front Area Wall Gatepiers And Lampholder				56°18′40″N 3°35′15″W	Category B	5953	Upload Photo
Fraser, Thimblerow, Bridge Of Earn Road				56°18′42″N 3°35′09″W	Category C(S)	5960	Upload Photo
'skyemore', Bridge Of Earn Road				56°18′43″N 3°35′07″W	Category C(S)	5966	Upload Photo
County Council Houses, St. Serf's Terrace, Perth Road				56°18′44″N 3°35′09″W	Category C(S)	5967	Upload Photo
Findlay, Perth Road				56°18′46″N 3°35′08″W	Category C(S)	5971	Upload Photo
'Kirkgate House' (Miss Fanning) And Mcnamee, Tron Square				56°18′44″N 3°35′15″W	Category C(S)	5977	Upload Photo
Dunning Hotel, 1 Station Road, A. P. Arnot's Shop And 'Maule House', Station Road And Auchterarder Road				56°18′45″N 3°35′19″W	Category C(S)	5979	Upload Photo
Alex Millar's, Kirkstyle Square				56°18′44″N 3°35′14″W	Category C(S)	5986	Upload Photo
G. & M. Goodwin's Property, Tron Square And Yetts Of Muckhart Road				56°18′45″N 3°35′16″W	Category C(S)	6025	Upload Photo
Thomson, Chalmers Street				56°18′45″N 3°35′06″W	Category C(S)	5927	Upload Photo
War Memorial, Chalmers Street And Perth Road				56°18′45″N 3°35′07″W	Category C(S)	5928	Upload Photo
Lawson And Nicholson, Upper Granco Street				56°18′45″N 3°35′03″W	Category C(S)	5930	Upload Photo
'Caber Feidh', Upper Granco Street				56°18′44″N 3°35′03″W	Category C(S)	5932	Upload Photo
Gatepiers Of 'Old Bank House'				56°18′48″N 3°35′09″W	Category C(S)	5944	Upload Photo
Newton Of Pitcairns School, North Block				56°18′39″N 3°35′02″W	Category C(S)	5948	Upload Photo
Stewart's Property, Perth Road				56°18′47″N 3°35′08″W	Category C(S)	5973	Upload Photo
Crow, Perth Road				56°18′43″N 3°35′09″W	Category C(S)	5974	Upload Photo
'Ardshiel', Auchterarder Road				56°18′44″N 3°35′18″W	Category C(S)	5983	Upload Photo
Robertson And 'Crossways', Auchterarder Road And Yetts Of Muckhart Road				56°18′44″N 3°35′17″W	Category C(S)	5984	Upload Photo
'Thorntree Villa', (Miss E. Mailer's Property), Yetts Of Muckhart Road				56°18′42″N 3°35′15″W	Category C(S)	6000	Upload Photo
Parish Churchyard, Walls, Monument And Session House				56°18′45″N 3°35′14″W	Category B	6019	Upload another image
Mr. Crow's Store, Kirk Wynd				56°18′46″N 3°35′16″W	Category C(S)	6021	Upload Photo
J.S. Calderwood's Property, Kirk Wynd And Tron Square				56°18′46″N 3°35′16″W	Category C(S)	6022	Upload Photo
Maggie Wall's Monument				56°18′32″N 3°36′29″W	Category B	5911	Upload another image
Garvock House Burial Enclosure				56°18′54″N 3°33′23″W	Category C(S)	5917	Upload Photo
Leadketty Farm House				56°19′16″N 3°35′28″W	Category B	5919	Upload Photo
'Grampian View', Chalmers Street				56°18′45″N 3°35′06″W	Category C(S)	5926	Upload Photo
'Hazelwood' And Adjoining Workshop. Upper Granco Street				56°18′46″N 3°35′04″W	Category C(S)	5931	Upload Photo
Philp, Upper Granco Street				56°18′45″N 3°35′05″W	Category C(S)	5935	Upload Photo
Hutchison And 'Cadzow', Lower Granco Street				56°18′48″N 3°35′08″W	Category C(S)	5941	Upload Photo
'Granco House', Lower Granco Street				56°18′50″N 3°35′11″W	Category B	5947	Upload Photo
Newton Of Pitcairns School, South Block				56°18′39″N 3°35′00″W	Category C(S)	5949	Upload Photo
D. & J. Henderson's, Bridgend (Bridge Of Earn Road)				56°18′43″N 3°35′11″W	Category C(S)	5955	Upload Photo
'Rowanbank', Thimblerow, Bridge Of Earn Road				56°18′42″N 3°35′08″W	Category C(S)	5958	Upload Photo
Laing, Thimblerow, Bridge Of Earn Road				56°18′42″N 3°35′09″W	Category C(S)	5959	Upload Photo
Boag, Auchterarder Road				56°18′42″N 3°35′20″W	Category C(S)	5980	Upload Photo
Farquharson And Church Hall, Kirkstyle Square				56°18′44″N 3°35′13″W	Category C(S)	5987	Upload Photo
Clark, Yetts Of Muckhart Road				56°18′44″N 3°35′16″W	Category C(S)	5992	Upload Photo
'shandene' (Storrar), Yetts Of Muckhart Road				56°18′44″N 3°35′16″W	Category C(S)	5994	Upload Photo
'Glenfoot' (Graham), Yetts Of Muckhart Road				56°18′41″N 3°35′14″W	Category C(S)	5996	Upload Photo
'Tron House', Tron Square				56°18′45″N 3°35′17″W	Category C(S)	6023	Upload Photo
Duncrub Dovecot				56°19′01″N 3°35′39″W	Category A	5915	Upload another image
Baldinnies Farmhouse				56°19′57″N 3°34′41″W	Category B	5920	Upload Photo
Whytock, Chalmers Street				56°18′45″N 3°35′07″W	Category C(S)	5924	Upload Photo
Batchelor, Upper Granco Street				56°18′44″N 3°35′03″W	Category C(S)	5933	Upload Photo
'Kilard', Lower Granco Street				56°18′48″N 3°35′09″W	Category C(S)	5938	Upload Photo
House (Aineas Dougal), Lower Granco Street				56°18′48″N 3°35′09″W	Category B	5943	Upload Photo
Hollybank, Yetts Of Muckhart Road				56°18′39″N 3°35′15″W	Category C(S)	5952	Upload Photo
Dr. Janet Mclaren's Surgery, Bridge Of Earn Road				56°18′43″N 3°35′10″W	Category C(S)	5957	Upload Photo
'Hillcrest' And 'sunnyside', Bridge Of Earn Road				56°18′43″N 3°35′09″W	Category C(S)	5963	Upload Photo
James Crow, Perth Road				56°18′45″N 3°35′09″W	Category C(S)	5968	Upload Photo
Kirkstyle Hotel, Kirkstyle Square				56°18′44″N 3°35′13″W	Category B	5985	Upload Photo
Co-Operative House, Thorntree Square				56°18′44″N 3°35′15″W	Category C(S)	5989	Upload Photo
Robertson's Bakehouse, Yetts Of Muckhart Road				56°18′44″N 3°35′17″W	Category C(S)	5993	Upload Photo
'Dalshian' (Wallace) Yetts Of Muckhart Road				56°18′41″N 3°35′14″W	Category C(S)	5997	Upload Photo
J. Lester, Post Office Building, Tron Square				56°18′45″N 3°35′16″W	Category C(S)	6026	Upload Photo
Kippen House Including Gatepiers And Quadrant Walls				56°17′56″N 3°35′15″W	Category B	51332	Upload Photo
Mr. Philip's Property, Thimblerow, Bridge Of Earn Road				56°18′42″N 3°35′10″W	Category C(S)	5962	Upload Photo
Thorntree Inn, Thorntree Square				56°18′43″N 3°35′14″W	Category C(S)	5988	Upload Photo
'Thorntree House', Thorntree Square				56°18′43″N 3°35′16″W	Category B	5991	Upload Photo
'Ladeside', Yetts Of Muckhart Road				56°18′41″N 3°35′13″W	Category C(S)	5999	Upload Photo
'straw House', Kirk Wynd (Empty: Mr. Crow)				56°18′47″N 3°35′15″W	Category B	6020	Upload Photo
R. Arnott (Trading As D. Hogg), Tron Square And Station Road				56°18′45″N 3°35′18″W	Category C(S)	6024	Upload Photo
Keltie Castle				56°18′05″N 3°36′19″W	Category A	5912	Upload Photo
Thorntree Court, Off Yetts Of Muckhart Road				56°18′43″N 3°35′17″W	Category C(S)	67	Upload Photo
J. Smith, Tron Square				56°18′46″N 3°35′17″W	Category C(S)	68	Upload Photo
Duncrub Chapel, (Now Shed: Mr. Marshall)				56°18′57″N 3°36′03″W	Category B	5914	Upload Photo
Inverdunning House				56°19′39″N 3°34′33″W	Category B	5918	Upload Photo
Baldinnies Mill And Steading				56°19′57″N 3°34′44″W	Category B	5921	Upload Photo
Broom, Smithy Filling Station Darleoch				56°20′26″N 3°36′55″W	Category C(S)	5922	Upload Photo
'Tarland' And 'Rose Cottage', Lower Granco Street				56°18′47″N 3°35′08″W	Category C(S)	5936	Upload Photo
Coach House And Outbuildings Of Hollybank (Miss Fletcher), Yetts Of Muckhart Road				56°18′40″N 3°35′14″W	Category C(S)	5951	Upload Photo
'Clifton Bank', Bridge Of Earn Road				56°18′43″N 3°35′08″W	Category C(S)	5965	Upload Photo
Dawson And Dixon, Perth Road				56°18′45″N 3°35′08″W	Category C(S)	5970	Upload Photo
J. Mitchell, Auchterarder Road				56°18′44″N 3°35′18″W	Category C(S)	5982	Upload Photo
House, Thorntree Square And Yetts Of Muckhart Road (Representatives Of Mrs. J. Miller)				56°18′44″N 3°35′15″W	Category C(S)	5990	Upload Photo
Kippen Lodge				56°18′02″N 3°35′05″W	Category C(S)	51333	Upload Photo
Garvock House				56°18′58″N 3°33′22″W	Category B	5916	Upload Photo
'The Knowes', Upper Granco Street And Bridge Of Earn Road. (Including Garden And Coach House)				56°18′44″N 3°35′02″W	Category C(S)	5929	Upload Photo
'Glengarry', Lower Granco Street				56°18′48″N 3°35′10″W	Category C(S)	5939	Upload Photo
Dewar And Miss Adams, Lower Granco Street				56°18′48″N 3°35′08″W	Category C(S)	5942	Upload Photo
'Old Bank House' And Slater's Workshop, Lower Granco Street				56°18′49″N 3°35′09″W	Category C(S)	5945	Upload Photo
Neave, Lower Granco Street				56°18′49″N 3°35′10″W	Category B	5946	Upload Photo
'Corshellach', Bridge Of Earn Road				56°18′43″N 3°35′10″W	Category C(S)	5956	Upload Photo
Robson, Perth Road				56°18′44″N 3°35′09″W	Category C(S)	5975	Upload Photo
'Lynton', Chalmers Street				56°18′44″N 3°35′08″W	Category C(S)	66	Upload Photo
Rossie Steading				56°18′12″N 3°37′17″W	Category C(S)	73	Upload Photo
Clow Bridge Over Water Of May				56°16′52″N 3°31′25″W	Category C(S)	5923	Upload Photo
Bridge Over Dunning Burn				56°18′44″N 3°35′12″W	Category C(S)	5954	Upload Photo
Brown, Thimblerow, Bridge Of Earn Road				56°18′41″N 3°35′09″W	Category C(S)	5961	Upload Photo
'Bridgend', Bridge Of Earn Road				56°18′43″N 3°35′08″W	Category C(S)	5964	Upload Photo
'Dunearn', Perth Road				56°18′45″N 3°35′08″W	Category C(S)	5969	Upload Photo
Stewart, Perth Road				56°18′46″N 3°35′08″W	Category C(S)	5972	Upload Photo
'Earnbank', Perth Road				56°18′44″N 3°35′08″W	Category C(S)	5976	Upload Photo
Craigielea, Station Road				56°18′45″N 3°35′19″W	Category C(S)	5978	Upload Photo
Town Hall, Auchterarder Road				56°18′44″N 3°35′19″W	Category C(S)	5981	Upload Photo
Co-Operative Shop, Yetts Of Muckhart Road				56°18′44″N 3°35′16″W	Category C(S)	5995	Upload Photo
Murray, Yetts Of Muckhart Road				56°18′41″N 3°35′14″W	Category C(S)	5998	Upload Photo

== Key ==
The scheme for classifying buildings in Scotland is:

- Category A: "buildings of national or international importance, either architectural or historic; or fine, little-altered examples of some particular period, style or building type."
- Category B: "buildings of regional or more than local importance; or major examples of some particular period, style or building type, which may have been altered."
- Category C: "buildings of local importance; lesser examples of any period, style, or building type, as originally constructed or moderately altered; and simple traditional buildings which group well with other listed buildings."

In March 2016 there were 47,288 listed buildings in Scotland. Of these, 8% were Category A, and 50% were Category B, with the remaining 42% being Category C.
