= Mongoloid (disambiguation) =

Mongoloid refers to an outdated historical grouping of various people indigenous to East Asia, Central Asia, Southeast Asia, North Asia, Polynesia, and the Americas.

Mongoloid may also refer to:

- Mongolian idiocy, previously used to refer to Down syndrome – now a pejorative term
- Mongoloid languages, another name for the Sino-Tibetan languages
- "Mongoloid" (song) (1977), Devo's first single

== See also ==
- Mongoloid fold, a skin fold of the upper eyelid
- Mong (disambiguation)
- Mongo (disambiguation)
- Mongolism (disambiguation)
