= Mongolic =

Mongolic may refer to:

- Mongolic languages
- Mongolic peoples, ethnic groups that natively speak the Mongolic languages

== See also ==
- Mongols (disambiguation)
- Mongolia (disambiguation)
