= St. Mungo's =

St. Mungo's may refer to:

- St Mungo's Cathedral, Glasgow a.k.a. Glasgow Cathedral and the High Kirk of Glasgow
- St Mungo's Hospital for Magical Maladies and Injuries from the Harry Potter books
- St Mungo's (charity), London's largest homelessness charity
- St Mungo's Parish Church, Clackmannanshire, Scotland
- St Mungo's Church, Dearham, Cumbria, England

== See also ==
- Little St Mungo's Chapel, Glasgow (also known as St Mungo's Beyond the Walls and St Mungo's in the Fields)
