= Mongolia (disambiguation) =

Mongolia is a modern state in east-central Asia.

Mongolia may also refer to:

== Places ==
- Mongolia, Ontario, Canada
- In Pan-Mongolism, idea that advocates cultural and political solidarity of Mongols
- Mongol heartland, the contiguous geographical area in which the Mongols primarily live
- Mongolian Plateau, a region as part of the Central Asian Plateau
- Inner Mongolia, an autonomous region of China south of the Mongolian state
- Outer Mongolia, an outer region of the Qing dynasty, most of which is now covered by the Mongolian state (1691–1911)

== Historical periods or states ==
- Mongol Empire (1206–1368)
- Mongolia under Yuan rule (1271–1368)
- Mongolia under Qing rule (1635–1911)
- Bogd Khanate of Mongolia (1911–1919, 1921–1924)
- Occupation of Mongolia (1919–1921)
- Mongolian People's Republic (1924–1992)

== Ship ==
- Baltavia, 1901 ship formerly named the Mongolia
- SS Mongolia (1903)

== Publication ==
- Mongolia (magazine), Spanish monthly humour magazine

== See also ==
- Greater Mongolia (disambiguation)
- Mongols (disambiguation)
- Mongolic (disambiguation)
