= Thai nationality law =

Thai Citizenship Act

Parliament of Thailand
- Long title: An Act relating to Thai citizenship
- Territorial extent: Thailand
- Enacted by: Government of Thailand
- Passed: 4 August 1965
- Royal assent: 21 July 1965
- Signed by: Bhumibol Adulyadej
- Commenced: 5 August 1965

Amends
- February 1992; March 1992; 2008; 2012
- Status: Amended

Thai nationality law includes principles of both jus sanguinis and jus soli. Thailand's first Nationality Act was passed in 1913. The most recent law dates to 2008.

== Jus sanguinis ==
The law of bloodright is the primary mode of acquiring Thai nationality. Any person who is a child of a mother or a father who possesses Thai nationality is a Thai national at birth under Section 7 of the Thailand Nationality Act.

Jus sanguinis via the paternal line requires a submission to appropriate authorities indicating legitimacy of the child, or a DNA test proving a biological relationship.

== Jus soli ==
Fongchan Suksaneh was one of the first people to gain jus soli citizenship under the 2008 Nationality Act

The first Thai Nationality Act of 1913 and most subsequent acts have included the principle of jus soli, though at times with various restrictions. The 1952 Nationality Act rescinded the 1913 act's provisions for jus soli, in response to concerns over the integration of the children of Chinese immigrants, but unlimited jus soli was restored just four years later by the 1956 Nationality Act. In 1972, due to illegal immigration from Burma and concerns over communist insurgency in border areas, the Nationality Act was amended to require that both parents be legally resident and domiciled in Thailand for at least five years in order for their child to be granted Thai citizenship at birth, and revoked citizenship from many people who had it under the earlier act. This caused difficulties for members of hill tribes in border areas who were not registered in the 1956 census, since they had no way to prove that their parents were Thai as opposed to having entered the country as refugees.

Article 23 of the 2008 Nationality Act reversed the 1972 act, restoring citizenship to those who had it before, and allowing people born in Thailand before 1992 to apply for Thai citizenship anew. However, applicants have reported various difficulties in getting government officials to process their applications. Following the act's passage, one of the first people to gain citizenship under Article 23 was Fongchan Suksaneh, a child of American missionaries to the Mlabri people who was born in Chiang Mai Province. Children, neither of whose parents are citizens and at least one of whose parents is an illegal alien, remain not entitled to jus soli citizenship. Furthermore, someone who has Thai citizenship by sole virtue of jus soli may still lose Thai citizenship under various conditions of the 2008 act (such as living abroad) which do not apply to people who have Thai citizenship by virtue of jus sanguinis. In 2013, the Ministry of Interior proposed new immigration regulations, based on Section 7 of the 2008 Nationality Act, to declare children who did not gain Thai citizenship at birth as illegal immigrants and have them deported.

== Naturalisation ==
The strictness of Thailand's requirements for naturalisation have varied over the years, beginning with fairly loose restrictions, which were tightened in the mid-20th century before being loosened again. The Nationality Act of 1939 tightened the requirements, stipulating that applicants for naturalisation had to abandon their foreign names and take Thai names, as well as send their children to Thai schools; these rules were part of a broader trend of laws designed to promote the assimilation of the Thai Chinese community. From 1935 to 1958, a total of 4,652 Chinese naturalised as Thai citizens. More than half of the naturalisations occurred in 1943 alone, during the Japanese occupation of Thailand, apparently driven by the desire to escape wartime restrictions on foreigners.

Under the 1992 Nationality Act, naturalisation as a Thai citizen requires five years of residence in Thailand, Thai language proficiency, as well as proof of a certain over 80,000 baht income and pay income tax over five years, and a declaration of intent to renounce one's previous citizenship. However, for foreign women married to Thai men, the requirements are reduced to income over 15,000 baht for the husband, only three years of residence, and the applicant is not required to prove language ability or renounce their previous citizenship. In 2003, 48 people applied for naturalisation, of whom ten were approved.

Under Section 99 of the 2007 Constitution of Thailand, a naturalised citizen does not gain the right to vote until five years after naturalisation; under Sections 101, 115, 174, and 205, naturalised citizens have no right at all to stand for election to the House of Representatives or the Senate, or to be appointed as a minister or a justice of the Constitutional Court.

== Citizenship status ==
Thai nationality can generally be divided into three levels of citizenship:

- Both parents must be Natural-born-citizen, (Note: มีสัญชาติไทยโดยการเกิด และบิดามารดาผู้ให้กำเนิดมีสัญชาติไทยโดยการเกิด แต่ถ้าบิดาเป็นนายทหารชั้นสัญญาบัตรหรือชั้นประทวน หรือเป็นข้าราชการตำรวจซึ่งมีสัญชาติไทยโดยการเกิดแล้ว มารดาจะมิใช่เป็นผู้มีสัญชาติไทยโดยการเกิดก็ได้) a Commissioned officer requirement.
  - If father is Natural-born-citizen and he is a commissioned officer or non-commissioned officer or a police officer, the individual's mother does not have to be a Natural-born-citizen.
  - If father is Natural-born-citizen, the individual can wait to become commissioned after five years of employment.
- Natural-born-citizen, (Note: มีสัญชาติไทยโดยการเกิด) is reserved for political careers and some government work (such as judiciary, attorney, police etc.).
- Naturalized person, (Note: มีสัญชาติไทย) a person who is naturalized as a Thai must have obtained Thai nationality for at least five years to be eligible to vote.

== Statelessness ==
As of 2016 there were 443,862 stateless people in Thailand who were born in Thailand and live there. Mostly they are from hill tribes or are the children of illegal migrants, most of them from Myanmar. Stateless people in Thailand suffer serious disadvantages. Unlike Thai citizens, they cannot use government facilities where they must first show an ID card. They cannot go to a clinic or hospital for treatment of illness or injury. They cannot open a bank account. They cannot buy and use a smartphone, or own and drive a car, or buy property or a home. Some progress is being made, but "...these efforts are halfhearted and plagued with bureaucratic hurdles" according to the Bangkok Post. It gives as an example a new law, passed in 2008, that grants Thai citizenship to stateless people. But it applies only to those who were born before 26 February 1992, thus impacting the young most harshly. The good news is that stateless children can now attend state schools. Also, a new law allows stateless people to seek employment in professions not explicitly reserved for Thais. State hospitals now issue birth certificates to all children, a formality often neglected in the past. Importantly, the Thai military government has adopted the goal of "zero statelessness" by 2024.

== Dual nationality ==
There is ongoing confusion regarding the issue of holding Thai dual nationality, largely due to outdated interpretations and misconceptions about the Thai Nationality Act.

Under current Thai law, individuals who are born with Thai and another nationality, naturalize as Thai citizens, or acquire a foreign nationality after birth are generally permitted to retain their Thai citizenship without issue.

The main categories affected include the following:

– Dual-national children: A common misconception is that individuals born with both Thai and foreign nationality must choose one citizenship upon reaching age 20. However, Section 14 of the Thai Nationality Act merely allows a one-year window after the 20th birthday for those wishing to renounce Thai nationality—typically in order to retain another nationality. There is no legal requirement to make such a choice, and no penalty for keeping both nationalities.

– Thai women acquiring a foreign spouse’s nationality: Before the 1992 amendment to the Nationality Act, Thai women who automatically acquired their foreign husband's nationality would lose their Thai citizenship. However, under the current Section 13, Thai citizenship is retained unless the individual formally submits a request to renounce it. Dual nationality is now permitted in such cases.

– Foreign women naturalizing through marriage to a Thai husband: Women who acquire Thai nationality through marriage are generally allowed to retain their original citizenship, unless their country of origin prohibits dual nationality. However, Thai citizenship may be revoked if the individual is found to have made a false declaration in their application, uses their foreign passport to enter or conduct legal matters in Thailand, resides outside Thailand for more than five years without maintaining domicile, engages in activities harmful to national security or public order, or retains the nationality of a state at war with Thailand.

== See also ==
- Mong Thongdee
