= Foundation for National Parks & Wildlife =

Australian not-for-profit organisation

FNPW Logo

The Foundation for National Parks & Wildlife is an Australian not-for-profit, non-governmental organisation that was incorporated on 29 June 1970. Its purpose is to foster the protection of Australia's native plants, animals and cultural heritage through fundraising for environmental education and conservation projects. Since 1970 the organisation has raised more A$ 45 million ($1 million+ per year on average) for environmental conservation. The foundation was founded as a New South Wales–focused organisation, however in 2000 the foundation's members voted to amend its constitution so that the organisation could expand the scope of its work Australia-wide.

== Projects ==
Since 1970 the foundation has acquired over 600,000 hectares of habitat and places of natural beauty for 50 national parks and nature reserves, including Mungo National Park, the Daintree Rainforest, and South Australian protected areas. The foundation acquires land through purchase, donation and bequest. The foundation funded threatened species recovery programs and research for more than 32 species of birds, reptiles, mammals, amphibians and plants. Animals included the Lord Howe Island woodhen, the Gould's petrel, the malleefowl and the yellow-footed rock-wallaby. The foundation also funded cultural heritage conservation projects for more than ten Aboriginal and European historical sites, including Fort Denison, QStation and Hill End. Other projects focused on education and awareness raising, which included implementation, improvement and maintenance of walking tracks, viewing platforms, interpretive signage and disabled access in many national parks.

The foundation has a history of receiving donations of land where that land has a conservation value, especially if it is located near land that is already conserved (e.g. existing National Parks).

=== Mungo National Park ===
The foundation for National Parks & Wildlife acquired the land for the Mungo National Park, NSW and donated it to the National Reserve System in 1979. It also funded a resident archaeologist to work on the site from 1979 to 1983. The foundation established the Mungo Visitors Centre and Laboratory in 1983. With further sponsorship from BHP, the foundation implemented the Mungo National Park 60 km long guided vehicle drive in 1990.

== Policy ==
The foundation's charter and policies indicate that:

- Funds only go to those projects that have a tangible conservation outcome.
- All donations over A$2 are tax-deductible.
- Administration costs are kept low, and the foundation does not employ external fundraising agencies.
- Donors’ rights are respected and their details kept confidential - the foundation does not sell lists or share lists with other organisations.
- The foundation refrains from fundraising in the streets or at people's doors.

== Backyard Buddies Program ==
The foundation runs the Backyard Buddies program: an awareness raising program about Australian plants and animals that are likely to be seen in urban environments, and gives tips on how to coexist happily with these species. The Backyard Buddies program also sells Backyard Buddy Toys - the funds from these toys go toward Foundation projects to conserve and protect several species of animals, including koalas, wombats, little penguins, endangered wallaby species and more.

== Key persons ==
The Hon. Tom Lewis AO founded the Foundation for National Parks & Wildlife when he was New South Wales' Minister for Lands in 1970.

Patrons

Patrons of the organization have always been Governor of New South Wales

- 1971-1979 Roden Cutler (Governor of New South Wales)
- 1980-1988 James Rowland (Governor of New South Wales)
- 1989-1990 David Martin (Governor of New South Wales)
- 1990-1995 Peter Sinclair (Governor of New South Wales)
- 1996-2001 Gordon Samuels (Governor of New South Wales)
- 2001–2015 Marie Bashir (Governor of New South Wales)
- 2015–Present Peter Cosgrove (Governor-General of Australia)

Presidents

- 1971–1982 F.S. Buckley
- 1982–1996 Michael J. Crouch AO
- 1996–1998 Guy S. Cooper
- 1998–2005 John Gillis Broinowski AM
- 2005–2013 Peter Janssen
- 2013–Present Garry Browne AM

CEOs

- 1978–1988 Michael Arnett
- 1989–1992 Stephen Sainsbury
- 1992–1999 Alison Evans
- 1999–2000 Michelle Dunn
- 2000–2011 Leonie Gale
- 2011–2012 Steve Corbett
- 2012–2016 Susanna Bradshaw
- 2016–Present Ian Darbyshire

== See also ==
- Conservation movement
- Ecology movement
- Environmentalism
- Environmental movement
