= Lake Mungo remains =

Prehistoric human remains found in Australia

The Lake Mungo remains are three prominent sets of human remains that are Aboriginal Australian: Lake Mungo 1 (also called Mungo Woman, LM1, and ANU-618), Lake Mungo 2 (LM2), and Lake Mungo 3 (also called Mungo Man, Lake Mungo III, and LM3). Lake Mungo is in New South Wales, Australia, specifically the World Heritage listed Willandra Lakes Region.

Mungo woman (LM1) was discovered in 1968 and is one of the world's oldest known cremations.

The remains known as Lake Mungo 2 (LM2) were recovered at the same time as LM1, and consist "...of approximately thirty small fragments, mostly of the cranium and vertebrae".

The remains designated Mungo man (LM3) were discovered in 1974, and are dated to around 40,000 years old, the Pleistocene epoch, and are the oldest Homo sapiens (human) remains found on the Australian continent.

== Geology ==
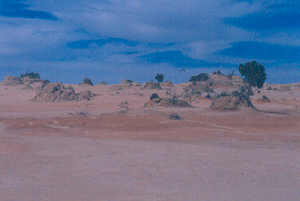
The shore of Lake Mungo.

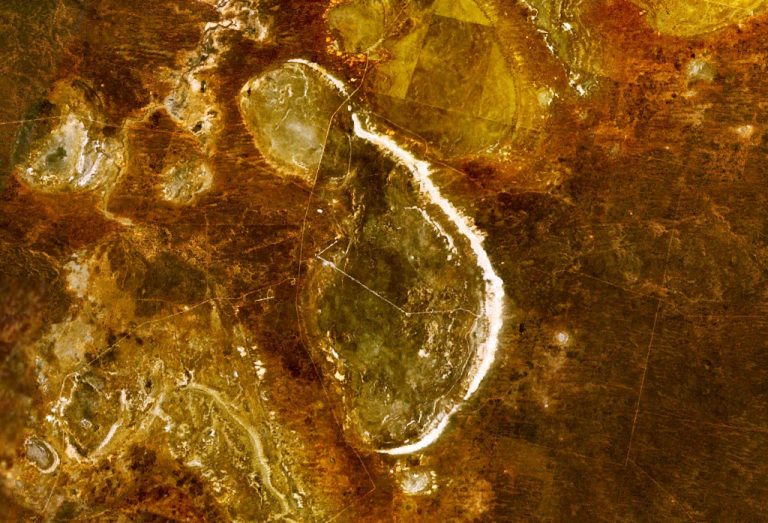
Landsat 7 imagery of Lake Mungo. The white line defining the eastern shore of the lake is the sand dune, or lunette, where most archaeological material has been found

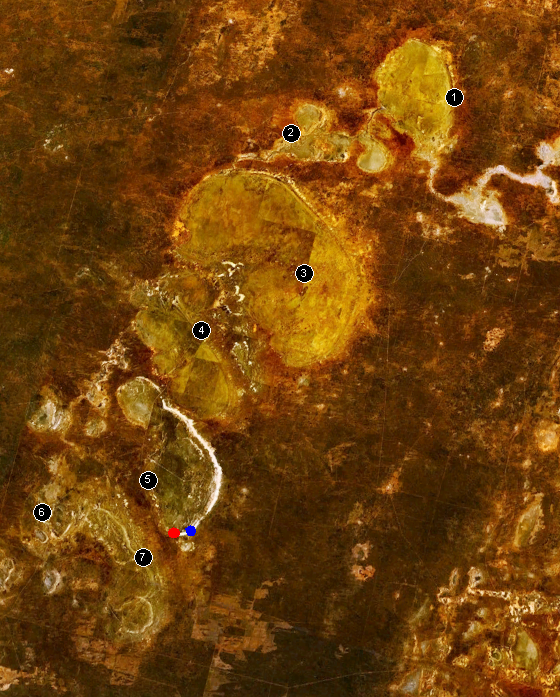
LM1 (red) LM3 (blue) The white line shows the eastern shore of the lake, the sand dune, or lunette, where most archaeological material has been found

Lake Mungo is a dry lake located in south-eastern Australia, in the south-western portion of New South Wales. It is about 760 kilometres (470 mi) due west of Sydney and 90 kilometres (56 mi) north-east of Mildura, and 110 kilometres north-west of Balranald. The lake is the central feature of Mungo National Park, and is one of seventeen lakes in the World Heritage listed Willandra Lakes Region. Sediments at Lake Mungo have been deposited over more than 100,000 years. There are three distinct layers of sands and soil forming the Walls around the edge of the lake. The oldest is the reddish Gol Gol layer, formed between 100,000 and 120,000 years ago. The middle greyish layer is the Mungo layer, deposited between 50,000 and 25,000 years ago. The most recent is the pale brown Zanci layer, which was laid down mostly between 25,000 and 15,000 years ago.

The Mungo layer, which was deposited during the last glacial period, is archaeologically the richest. Although this layer corresponds with a time of low rainfall and cooler weather, more rainwater ran off the western side of the Great Dividing Range during that period, keeping the lake full and teeming with fish and waterbirds. It supported a significant human population and had abundant resources, as well as many varieties of Australian megafauna.

During the last ice age period, the water level in the lake fell, and it became a salt lake. This made the soil alkaline, which helped to preserve the remains left behind.

== Lake Mungo 1 (LM1) ==
LM1 was discovered on July 15 1968, at the Willandra Lakes Region by Jim Bowler with the University of Melbourne.

LM1 has been 14C dated at 24,700 to 19,030 years ago. A date of 26,250 ±1120 BP was achieved with charcoal from a hearth 15 cm above the burial. Preservation of the remains is poor. Very limited detailed information was published before the bones were unconditionally repatriated to the Indigenous people of Australia in 1992. A lack of a detailed description of the remains along with a limited distribution of casts with no access to the original material makes it difficult to assess the published material.

=== Cremation burial ===
The reconstruction and description were mainly done by Alan Thorne at the Australian National University. LM1 was an early human inhabitant of the continent of Australia. Her remains are one of the oldest sets of anatomically modern human remains found in Australia.

It represents one of the world's oldest known cremations. The finding implies that complicated burial rituals existed in early human societies.

The bones of LM1 are thought to imply that after she died, the corpse was burned, then smashed, then burned a second time before being liberally covered with ochre, sourced from a location several hundred kilometres from the site.

=== Current status ===
The bones were unconditionally repatriated in 1992 to the traditional owners, an alliance called the Three Traditional Tribal Groups (3TTG), consisting of the Paakantji, the Muthi Muthi, and the Ngiyampaa. LM1 had become a symbol of the long Aboriginal presence in Australia, and an important icon for both archaeologists and Indigenous Australians. LM1 was locked vault at the Mungo National Park exhibition centre. The vault had a double lock and could be opened only if two keys are used. One key was controlled by archaeologists, the other by the local Indigenous peoples.

In late 2013, the NSW government, dismissed all management structures, leaving nothing in place to own or care for the remains. A new plan of management was delivered by a consultancy in early 2014, but there was no one to implement it.

On 24 May 2022 Mungo Lady and Mungo Man were reburied. In a statement, Heritage NSW, which had custody of the remains, said the state government “did not authorise, conduct, or endorse the removal and subsequent burial of any remains on 24 May”.

== Lake Mungo 3 (LM3) ==
=== Discovery ===
Lake Mungo 3 (LM3) was discovered by ANU geomorphologist Jim Bowler on 26 February 1974 when shifting sand dunes exposed the remains. LM3 was found near Lake Mungo, one of several dry lakes in the southeast part of the continent and 500m east of the LM1 site. The body had been laid out in great ceremony on its back, with knees bent and hands positioned at the groin with the fingers interlocked. Next to the body were the remains of fire. The body had been sprinkled with red ochre, in the earliest known example of such a sophisticated and artistic burial practice. This ritual burial aspect of the discovery has been particularly significant to Aboriginal Australians, since it indicates that certain cultural traditions have existed on the Australian continent for much longer than previously thought. At the time of LM3's discovery, it was believed that Aboriginal peoples had arrived in Australia from Asia around 20,000 years ago. Since the discovery of LM3, further archeological finds at Lake Mungo suggest that human occupation of the area dates as far back as 46,000–50,000 years ago.

==== Morphology ====
The skeleton had belonged to an individual who, based on evidence of osteoarthritis in the lumbar vertebrae, eburnation, and severe wear on the teeth with pulp exposure, was about 50 years old when he died. The cranium had a gracile character, which contrasts with the morphology of modern Indigenous Australians. Parts of the skeleton had deteriorated in situ: substantial portions of the skull were missing and most of the bones in the limbs have suffered surface damage.

Determination of LM3's sex was initially difficult, due to the deterioration of the skull and pelvis bones, which normally carry many features used for this purpose. Nevertheless, studies of other features suggest strongly that the remains were those of an adult male. A subsequent study using the length of limb bones to estimate LM3's height, suggests a height of 170 centimetres (67 inches or 5 ft 7 in), an above-average height for modern Aboriginal males, but shorter than many Pleistocene Australian males.

=== Age ===
The first estimate of LM3's age was made in 1976 when the team of paleoanthropologists from the Australian National University (ANU) who excavated LM3 published their findings. They estimated that LM3 was between 28,000 and 32,000 years old. They did not test LM3's remains directly, but rather established an estimate by stratigraphic comparison with LM1, an earlier set of partially cremated remains also found at Lake Mungo.

In 1987, an electron spin resonance test conducted on bone fragments from LM3's skeleton established an estimate of his age at 31,000 years, plus or minus 7,000 years. In 1999 Thermoluminescence dating work was carried out on quartz from unburnt sediment associated with the LM3 burial site with the selective bleach results indicating a burial older than 24,600 ± 2,400 and younger than 43,300 ± 3,800 years ago. Later Thorne et al. (1999), arrived at a new estimate of 62,000 ± 6,000 years. This estimate was determined by combining data from uranium-thorium dating, electron spin resonance dating and optically stimulated luminescence (OSL) dating of the remains and the immediately surrounding soil.

However, this estimate was very controversial. The lowest level of the LM3 which are as old as 43,000 years demonstrated that LM3 should not be older than the lowest layer. However, the ANU team had dated the stratum itself to be between 59,000 and 63,000 years old. The problems with using uranium-thorium dating on tooth enamel were criticised. The results from 25 additional OSL tests suggest that LM3 can not be older than 50,000 years BP. According to anthropologist Peter Brown, with the absence of the original deposit that once lay above the burial, a minimum age for the burial has not been established, only a possible maximum.

In 2003, Professor Bowler led a project bringing together a multi-disciplinary team of Australian expert groups (comprising four Australian universities, the NSW National Parks & Wildlife Service and the CSIRO, as well as including descendants of the Mungo people) to collaborate on a final determination of the skeleton's age. They reached a consensus that LM3 is about 40,000 years old. This age largely corresponds with stratigraphic evidence using four different dating methods. The age of 40,000 years is currently the most widely accepted age for the LM3, making LM3 the second oldest modern human fossil east of India. The study also found that LM1 was a similar age to LM3, and not 30,000 years old, as previously thought. The LM1 remains are generally held to be the earliest evidence of human cremation yet discovered.

The current mainstream thinking, the recent African origin of modern humans model, suggests that all humans outside of Africa alive today descended from a small group which left Africa at a specific time, currently generally estimated at about 60,000 years ago. This estimate of 60,000 years is arrived at from the recent breakthrough of widespread genetic investigation. In the model, humans then fairly quickly spread over the whole globe, from that starting point or bottleneck.

This explains the controversy of Thorne and other's older dates for LM3 - the establishment of (fully modern) human settlements in the different continents, could have happened only after (although perhaps remarkably shortly after) the exodus of the original (perhaps remarkably small) group of humans who left Africa via the middle-East.

=== Mitochondrial DNA and origins ===
In 2001, mitochondrial DNA (mtDNA) from the Lake Mungo 3 (LM3) skeleton was published and compared with several other sequences. It was found to have more than the expected number of sequence differences when compared to European human DNA (CRS). Comparison of the mitochondrial DNA with that of ancient and modern Aboriginal peoples led to the conclusion that Mungo Man fell outside the range of genetic variation seen in Australian Aboriginal people, and was used to support the multiregional origin of modern humans hypothesis. These results proved politically controversial, and several scientific concerns were raised over the validity of the results and analysis. With the consent of the Willandra Lakes World Heritage Area Aboriginal Elders Committee, a reanalysis was performed on the sequences derived from the 2001 study. The 2016 report of this study stated that the sequence for LM3 could have been contaminated with mtDNA of modern European origin, and it was uncertain if any of the DNA analysed in the 2001 study was ancient DNA. The authors did recover ancient mtDNA from the Willandra Lakes skeleton WLH4 specimen, "estimated to be late Holocene in age (~3,000–500 y B.P.)" and determined it to be of haplogroup S2, of Aboriginal origin. Following the reburial, the NSW government announced an independent review into how the burial proceeded contrary to the wishes of some traditional owner groups and without government authorisation. The Muthi Muthi, Paakantji and Ngiyampaa peoples remained divided on the question of whether the reburial was premature given the absence of a purpose-built keeping-place at Lake Mungo. In 2023, the NSW government committed $8.5 million toward the construction of a Keeping Place at Mungo National Park, which would allow future access to the remains for cultural and scientific purposes under Indigenous custodianship. The location of the 2022 reburial itself has not been publicly disclosed.

=== Return ===
On discovery in 1974, LM3 was removed from the site by archaeologists to the Australian National University in Canberra for safe-keeping and research. In 2014, leading up to the 40th anniversary of the discovery of LM3, the traditional owners of the Willandra Lakes formally requested return and repatriation of the remains. In 2015 ANU handed the remains over to Aboriginal elders at a formal ceremony and expressed "sincere regret" for their removal, recognising this had caused "ongoing grief" to Aboriginal communities. As an interim step, the skeleton was placed for safekeeping at the National Museum of Australia's human remains storage facility. Proposals had been ongoing for a facility to be built at Lake Mungo as a "keeping-place" that would allow the ancient remains to be returned to the earth while still allowing access for bona fide research. In November 2017 the remains were returned to Lake Mungo. There had been no agreement or funding by government for a keeping-place, and the remains were placed in a casket of ancient red gum and stored at an undisclosed location, along with 104 other fossilized individuals, until a final resting place could be decided upon. Oral historian Louise Darmody was commissioned by the State Library of New South Wales to record interviews with 12 people involved in the repatriation process. These included Paakantji, Ngiyampaa and Muthi Muthi people recognised as the traditional owners of Mungo National Park. Also interviewed were Professor Jim Bowler and other scientists associated with the 1974 discovery and subsequent research. All these were added to the Library's Indigenous Collecting Strategy and can be heard and transcribed through the Amplify website.

On 24 May 2022 LM3 was reburied, along with LM1. The burial went ahead despite an eleventh-hour legal challenge from traditional owners, and contradicting expectations that burial would be delayed until an incoming federal minister assessed the application. Traditional owners expressed outrage, with Mutthi Mutthi man Jason Kelly calling it "disrespectful" and a "desecration," while Paakantyi man Michael Young described it as a "criminal act against Indigenous people." They demanded an investigation into how the burial proceeded despite their legal filing and called for disclosure of the secret burial location, in order to provide culturally appropriate memorials.

== Further discoveries ==
In 1989, the skeleton of a child believed to be contemporary with Mungo man was discovered. Investigation of the remains was blocked by the 3TTG with the remains subsequently protected but remaining in-situ. An adult skeleton was exposed by erosion in 2005 but by late 2006 had been completely destroyed by wind and rain. This loss resulted in the Indigenous custodians' receiving a government grant of $735,000 to survey and improve the conservation of skeletons, hearths and middens that were eroding from the dunes. Conservation is in-situ and no research is permitted.

== Tourism ==
Mungo National Park can be visited by tourists and is accessed by an unsealed road. Boardwalks have been installed throughout the sand dunes and visitors are forbidden from stepping off the boardwalks unless accompanied by an Aboriginal guide. In 2014, fake bones were buried throughout the area as part of an experiment for La Trobe University. Within two weeks, nearly all of the artificial bones had been stolen.
