= Lake Mungo =

Dry lake in New South Wales, Australia

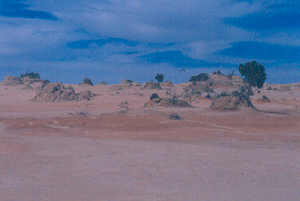
- The shore of Lake Mungo

- Location within New South Wales Location within Australia
- Interactive map of Lake Mungo
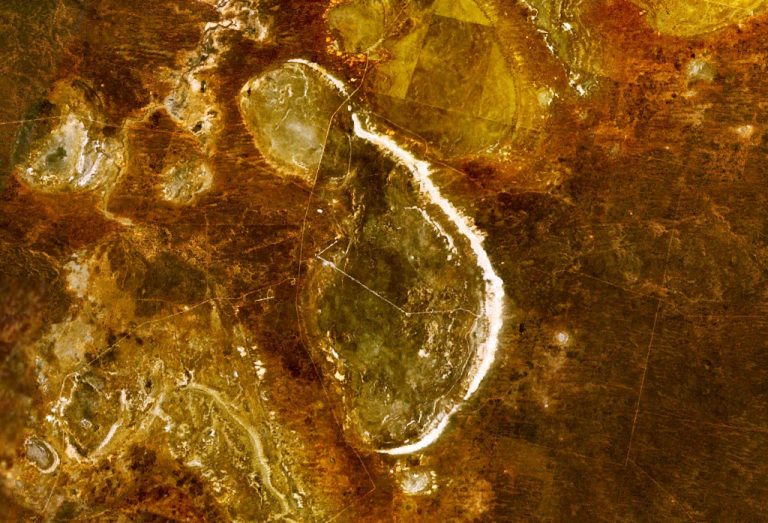
- Landsat 7 imagery of Lake Mungo. The white line defining the eastern shore of the lake is the sand dune, or lunette, where most archaeological material has been found
- Location: Hatfield, New South Wales
- Group: Willandra Lakes Region
- Coordinates: 33°45′S 143°05′E
- Type: Former lake
- Basin countries: Australia
- Managing agency: Mungo National Park
- Designation: World Heritage Site
- First flooded: ±140,000 years ago
- Max. length: 25 km (16 mi)
- Surface area: 200 km^{2} (77 sq mi)
- Max. depth: approx. 15 m (49 ft)
- Residence time: ±60,000 years ago
- Surface elevation: 66 m (217 ft)
- References: Mungo National Park site

Lake Mungo is a dry lake located in New South Wales, Australia. It is about 760 km (470 mi) due west of Sydney and 90 km (56 mi) north-east of Mildura. The lake is the central feature of Mungo National Park, and is one of seventeen lakes in the World Heritage listed Willandra Lakes Region. Many important archaeological findings have been made at the lake, most significantly the discovery of the remains of Mungo Man (the oldest human remains found in Australia), Mungo Woman (the oldest human remains in the world to be ritually cremated), and the location of the Lake Mungo geomagnetic excursion, the first convincing evidence that geomagnetic excursions are a geomagnetic phenomenon rather than sedimentological.

== History ==
Lake Mungo has been dry for approximately 20,000 years. The area that is now known as the Willandra Lakes Region was declared a National Park in 1979, and is the traditional land of the Paakantyi, Muthi Muthi, and Ngiyampaa people. These original inhabitants arrived approximately 50,000 years ago, and would have consumed emus and marsupials, as well as aquatic life such as crustaceans, freshwater mussels, and fish. In 1788, the First Fleet arrived in Sydney and spread several diseases to the Indigenous groups, such as Smallpox, subsequently resulting in depopulation for these communities. In the 1840s, European settlers physically invaded the land for agriculture purposes, bringing sheep and cattle for grazing. The indigenous groups who survived the seizure of their homeland and the European-introduced diseases, were forcibly moved to a mission at Balranald. In the 1920s, after WWI, settlers subdivided the Gol-Gol station for returned soldiers and created the Mungo woolshed, a station for shearing sheep. The station still exists today, and contains a 45-m woolshed built by Chinese laborers in 1869.

== Land structures ==
=== Geology ===
Sediments at Lake Mungo have been deposited over more than 120,000 years. On the eastern side of the Mungo lake bed are the "Walls of China," a series of crescent-shaped sand dunes or lunettes, up to 40 m (130 ft) in height, that stretch for more than 33 km, where most archaeological material has been found. There are five distinct layers of sands and soil forming the Walls. The oldest is the reddish Gol Gol layer, formed more than 120,000 years ago. Next is the greyish Mungo layer, split into Lower Mungo (between 55,000 and 40,000 years ago) and Upper Mungo (between 40,000 and 30,000 years ago). Above that is the Arumpo layer, deposited between 30,000 and 24,500 years ago, and finally the pale brown Zanci layer, laid down between 25,000 and 15,000 years ago.

The Mungo layer, which was deposited before the last ice age period, is the most archaeologically rich. Although the layer corresponded with a time of low rainfall and cooler weather, more rainwater ran off the western side of the Great Dividing Range during that period, keeping the lake full. It supported a significant human population, as well as many varieties of Australian megafauna.

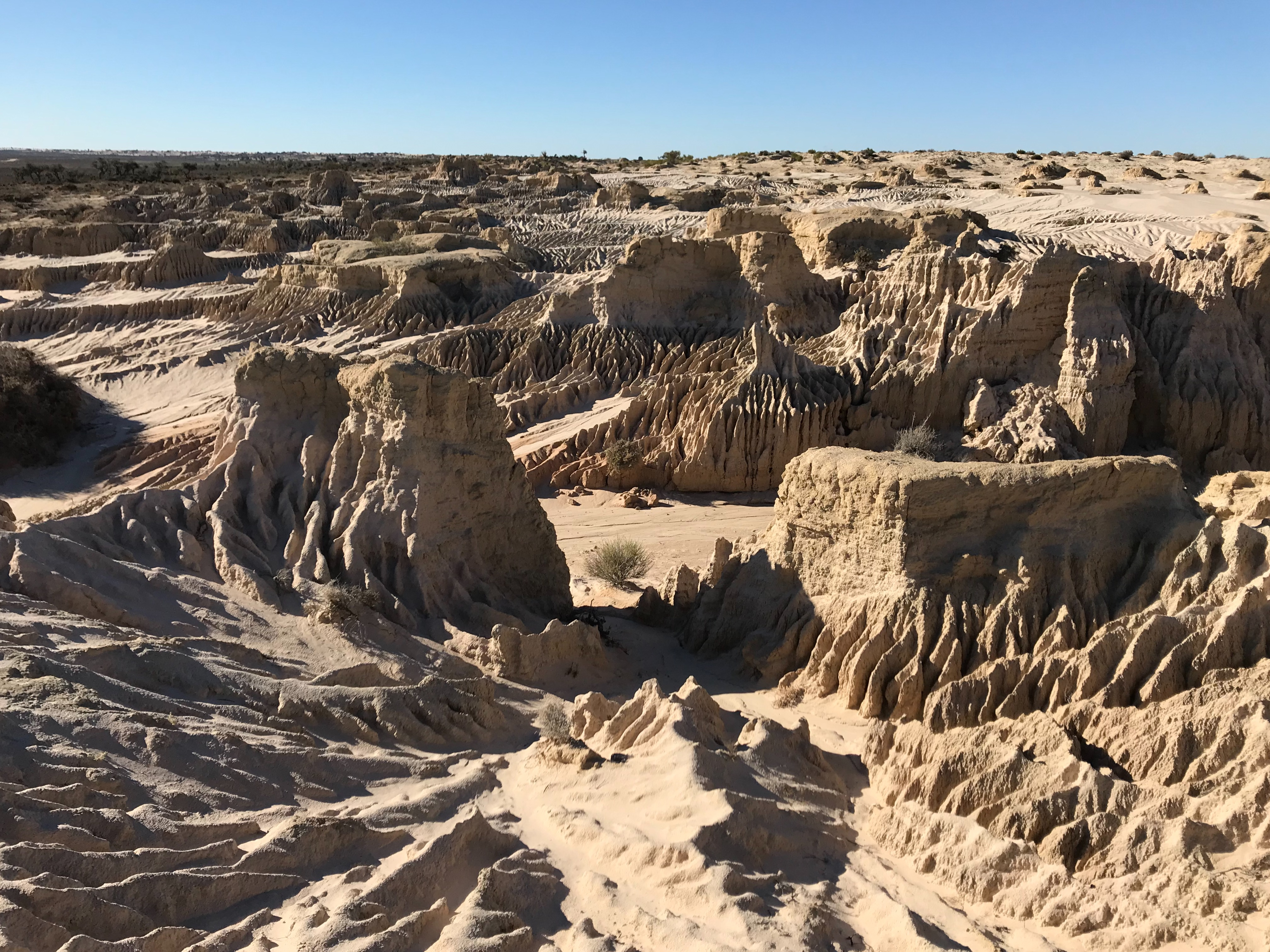
A close up of the Lake Mungo lunette

During the last ice age period, the water level in the lake dropped, and it became a salt lake. This made the soil alkaline, which helped to preserve the remains left behind in the Walls. Although the lake completely dried up several thousand years ago, ground vegetation remained on the Walls, which helped to stabilise them and protect them from erosion. With the arrival of European settlers in the area since the 1880s, introduced species, notably rabbits and sheep, have destroyed the vegetation cover. Herds of feral goats are also present in the region. This has led to increased erosion of the dunes. However, this erosion has led to the uncovering of many human and animal remains. Wind has moved sand and soil eastwards from the Walls, forming a mobile sand dune which moves farther east every year.

=== Formation of the 'mega-lake' ===
Lake Mungo is one of 19 lakes that make up the Willandra Lake Region. The formation of these lakes occurred over the last two million years. Within the last 50,000 years, high wind levels created crescent-shaped dunes along the shores of these lakes, called 'lunettes.'

Lake Mungo's water level was originally dependent on seasonal rainfall, runoff from the highlands of southeastern Australia, and overflow from nearby lakes and creeks. Between 22,700 and 24,700 years ago, an increase of runoff from the highlands and a shift in the basin of the lake due to neotectonic activity resulted in a "mega-lake" event. During this event, water levels rose 5 m and the lake volume increased by almost 250%. This overflow briefly connected Lake Mungo with the nearby Lake Leaghur, and the north part of the lunette temporarily formed an island.

The creation of the lunette island temporarily restricted human mobility in this area. However, archeological discoveries indicate that humans were able to frequently visit the island to transport stone tools and food across the water by swimming or using watercraft.

The "mega-lake" event was discovered using dGPS to measure main shoreline levels and comparing the results with a line of beach gravel that was more elevated than the main shoreline. It was determined that the event occurred during the transition into the Last Glacial Maximum (LGM) phase, which dates to approximately 26,000-20,000 years ago. Geological evidence indicates that due to the cold and dry conditions of the LGM, this caused the Willandra Lakes to subsequently enter a cycle of drying out and refilling. As a result, the "mega-lake" was a temporary occurrence that ended when the arid and cold conditions dried out the lake.

Around 14,000 years ago, the Willandra Creek, an inflow channel for the Willandra Lakes, ceased to flow and resulted in the lakes permanently drying out. Since then, Lake Mungo has remained dry, however people continued to occupy this area.

== Archaeological findings ==
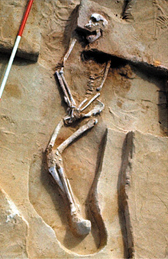
Mungo Man dated to 40,000 years ago

=== Lake Mungo remains ===
The most publicized findings at Lake Mungo have been Mungo Man and Mungo Woman. Mungo Woman, a partially cremated body, was discovered in 1969 by Jim Bowler from the Australian National University (ANU). Mungo Woman was only partially cremated before the remainder of her bones were crushed. The time that was taken into her burial is demonstration of an advanced ritualistic process. Mungo Man was also discovered by Bowler, on 26 February 1974. The remains were covered with red ochre, in what is the earliest known incidence of such a burial practice. Red ochre is commonly used in burials for ritualistic purposes.

Mungo Woman was initially dated to 26,000 years ago through radiocarbon methods, meanwhile Mungo Man was dated to 42-45,000 years ago from thermoluminescence. Another study proposed that Mungo Man could be almost 80,000 years old using electron-spin resonance however the study was widely criticised for its contradictions with other research and uncertainty of using electron-spin resonance as a dating method for the site. Further work using OSL dating by Bowler in 2003 has modified the dating of both remains to 40,000 years ago, revealing both burials to be near in timing and confirming Mungo Woman to be the earliest known human to have been cremated. The drastic difference in age for dating the Mungo Woman with radiocarbon was explained by contamination of newer carbon in the samples analyzed.

=== Custody of Lake Mungo remains ===
Mungo man, Mungo Woman, and other human remains found at Lake Mungo are of great significance to the Barkandji/Paakantyi, Mutthi Mutthi, and Ngiyampaa people. For these Aboriginal groups, the findings confirmed their deep ancestral history in the Willandra Lakes region and supported their claims for land rights. In the 1980s and 1990s, members of these groups advocated to stop the removal of ancestral remains from the land where they were found in an effort to protect and preserve Aboriginal cultural heritage. The Australian government and scientific community, on the other hand, argued for the scientific value of studying Lake Mungo remains, as well as for their importance to Australian national identity. After a period of tension and debate between the two parties, they agreed at a conference in June 1989 to respect each other's views and interests. Since then, most findings of human remains at Lake Mungo have been left at the site where they were found.

Today, both Mungo Man and Mungo Woman are in the custody of Aboriginal people. Mungo Lady was returned in 1992. Mungo Man was returned in 2015 but remained in the National Museum of Australia until 2017, when he and the remains of more than 100 other humans were moved back to where they were found at Lake Mungo. Mungo Man was transported in a casket made from 8,000 year old river wood and followed by a procession of community members. The return of Mungo Man was a significant reparation for Aboriginal groups to whom Mungo Man is an ancestor.

=== Archaeological evidence for occupation chronology ===
The first evidence of human occupation in Lake Mungo was revealed after an excavation of two Lake Mungo trenches contained 11 silcrete flakes. Later, the Mungo Woman and Mungo Man were discovered in 1968 and 1974, respectively. These discoveries revealed that humans occupied Lake Mungo starting around 50,000 years ago.

Since then, additional archaeological traces have been discovered in this area. On the lunette island, baked sediment hearths, stone artifacts, carbonated hearth stones, and other animal remains such as bones and fish otoliths were identified. These remains indicate that there was human activity on this island during the "mega-lake" period.

=== Lifestyle and tools ===
Fish otoliths have been recovered from hearths in Lake Mungo. These otoliths were radiocarbon dated to 19,000 years ago. Analysis of the geochemistry of the otoliths revealed that the fish arrived to the lake a few years before death. They likely came to the lake during flooding periods and then became trapped as the lake evaporated. Due to oxygen deprivation, the fish would have become sluggish and easy to catch. This provides the foundation for the theory that humans came to the lake during these evaporating periods to easily catch fish.

17 sandstone tools have been found at Lake Mungo. 10 of these date to 25-14,000 years ago in the Pleistocene, four date to around 8,000 years ago in the Holocene, and three could not be dated with certainty. Comparing the usewear on these tools with ethnographic and experimental sandstones confirmed that at least 14 tools were used for seed grinding (nine from the Pleistocene, all four Holocene tools, and one of the undated tools). Evidence for seed grinding in Australia during the Pleistocene is rare, only being confirmed in one other site called Cuddie Springs. Additionally, three shell tools have been found dating to 40-30,000 years ago, with a possible fourth tool dating to more than 40,000 years ago. Comparing the taphonomy and usewear of experimental shell tools established the addition of shells to the tool kit of the Pleistocene Australians.

The stone tools found at Lake Mungo also provide information about early use of heat treatment in Australia. Visual analysis of silcrete stone tools found at Lake Mungo reveal that many were heat treated. Through both radiocarbon and stratigraphic dating, these tools have been determined to be as old as 42,000 years. Previously, evidence for early Australian heat treatment only dated back to around 25,000 years ago. These new findings at Lake Mungo reveal the techniques and technologies that early occupants of Lake Mungo used to better their tools and lifestyles.

=== Lake Mungo geomagnetic excursion ===
In 1972, Archaeomagnetic studies were conducted on the prehistoric Aboriginal fireplaces occurring along the ancient shoreline of Lake Mungo. Magnetization preserved in oven-stones and baked hearths show that the axial dipole field moved up to 120 degrees from its normal position around 30,000 years ago. Called a geomagnetic excursion, the event occurred between 30,780 and 28,140 years BP with a very high field strength of 1 to 2×10^{−4} T (around 3.5 times higher than Earths current 5.8×10^{−5} T) which subsequently decreased to .2 to .3×10^{−4} T. There is also evidence of a second excursion around 26,000 BP with a field strength of .1 to .2×10^{−4} T. Because most of the excursions found before Lake Mungo were contained in sedimentary material, it had been suggested that the magnetic field directional anomalies were detrital or diagenetic in origin. The Lake Mungo results were due to thermoremanent magnetization, ruling out a sedimentological phenomenon.

Two excursions have been recorded in sediments from Skjonghelleren on Valderøy, Norway, with the Virtual Geomagnetic Pole (VGP) of one being synchronous with Lake Mungo. This suggests that the Lake Mungo event was global, rather than a local event. Data from lake sediments of a similar age in France having near identical magnetic field lines also support Lake Mungo being a global event. However, it has been suggested that Lake Mungo's anomalous field is the result of lightning strikes.

=== Lake Mungo today ===
The rich archaeological heritage of the site is very significant to the Aboriginal Australian people from the area. The Willandra region is inhabited by the Barkindji, Ngiyampaa and Mutthi Mutthi peoples, who have entered Joint Management Agreements with the Government of New South Wales to manage the lake and the Mungo National Park since 2001.
