= Northern Mongols =

The Northern Mongols can refer to:

- Outer Mongols, or Mongols in Outer Mongolia; most of which are Khalkha Mongols now living in modern Mongolia.
- The subgroup of Mongols composed of the Barga Mongols, Buryats and Hamnigan Buryats.
