= Saracen Head, Glasgow =

Pub in Glasgow, Scotland

Coordinates: 55°51′20.5″N 4°14′16.1″W

The Saracen Head (locally, Sarry Heid or Sarry) is a public house in Gallowgate, Glasgow, Scotland. Since 1755, there have been four different establishments of that or very similar names on close-nearby but different sites, which have sometimes been confused.

== The origin of the name, and the inn sign ==
Saracen is a historical name for Muslims, particularly the Ottoman Turks who fought the Crusaders. The Saracen's (also, Turk's) Head is known from elsewhere as a public house name (e.g. Saracen's Head, Birmingham and Saracen's Head, London). The Saracen's head is an uncommon charge in heraldry, typically a frontal view of a bearded head wearing a wreath of twisted cloth.

The original inn sign was a life-size three-quarter-length painting of a heavily bearded and -moustached man with ferocious expression and glaring eyes, wearing "an ample white turban, a claret-coloured robe, very wide light inexpressibles, and a broad red sash", in the act of drawing his scimitar from its scabbard. It was reused by the second establishment, had been copied, and still existed in 1856. More recent signs have been less striking, even drab.

== History ==
=== The first establishment ===
This operated from 1755 to 1791 or 1792, as The Saracen's Head Inn. It was built by Robert Tennent (Note: In 1740, Robert Tennent and his brother Hugh had founded the Glasgow brewery company H. & R. Tennent, which survives as Tennent Caledonian.) on land which had been part of the kirkyard of (the abandoned) Little St Mungo's Chapel, leased from the town council, to a general plan specified by the council. The council granted him permission to reuse masonry from the ruins of the bishop's castle at Townhead and from the walls of the old Gallowgate Port (the city's eastern gate). It was a substantial stone building three storeys high with 100 ft (30 m) frontage, and the first of its kind in Glasgow. A flight of broad stairs led up to the main entrance, set slightly back from the main frontage, into an entrance hall. There were 36 rooms with coal fires for lodgers, each with its own door off a common area (rather than through another lodging, or from outside). (Note: The sources do not say whether the lodgings consisted of single rooms, or of suites of rooms including at least a day room (with the fire) and one or more bedchambers, and perhaps also accommodation for personal servants.) Engagingly, Tennent advertised that the beds were "very good, clean, and free from bugs". Behind, there was a ballroom capable of accommodating a hundred people, with its own carriage entry on the western side, on a lane later called Great Dowhill. On the eastern side, there was stabling for 60 horses and a covered area for wheeled vehicles, with a private entry on what was later called Saracen's Lane. It was fashionable, and guests included Lords of Justiciary (senior judges) on circuit and members of the nobility. The two doormen (known as waiters) wore livery (embroidered coats and red plush breeches) and powdered hair. When judges or noblemen were expected, the doormen wore silk stockings. When judges were in residence, two town-officers (council employees) with red coats and shouldered halberds were stationed at the door. In 1856, it was said that the hotel "was long considered one of the most spacious and elegant in Scotland". However, in 1771, an anonymous writer in the London-based Gentleman's Magazine had described it as "the paragon of inns in the eyes of the Scotch, but most wretchedly managed".

In the late 1700s, there was a fashion for middle-class Glasgow families to send their daughters to the head cooks of the Black Bull Inn or the Saracen's Head Inn (Note: Between 1768 and 1777, both inns were run by James Graham.) to learn the arts of cooking and of setting a table. The cost was five shillings (about a day-and-a-half's wages for a skilled worker). In or about 1779, a dinner for local nobility and county gentry at the Saracen's Head admired the way that 15 or 16 comely young women in clean white aprons were serving at table. On the situation being explained, the younger and the sprightlier men sprang up to assist them in, or to distract them from, their duties.

On 7 July 1788 or 1790, the first mail coach from London (via Carlisle) to Glasgow arrived at the Saracen's Head. The interest was such that a crowd of horsemen rode to Tollcross to welcome it. (Note: According to "J. B.", the horsemen included the landlord of The Saracen's Head; but in 1788-1790, the inn was being run by a landlady, Jane or Jean Graham. It might refer to her second husband, James Buchanan (c. 1749 - 1793), who did no work; they had married in 1777.) (Note: The state of the roads was such that in 1763, a coach journey from London to Edinburgh (c. 400 miles (640 km)) took 12-16 (or, 11-18) days. By 1783, it took 4 days; and by 1786, 60 hours. In 1784, a coach journey from Glasgow to Edinburgh (c. 50 miles (80 km)) was a long day's travel. Expansion of the railway network from the 1840s made long-distance coach travel obsolete.) The stables continued to be a major departure and arrival post for coaches for more than 30 years after the inn's closure; by 1856, they had been converted into a candle factory.

The inn owned a delftware (blue-and-white decorated china) punch bowl made by the Delftfield Pottery Company of Glasgow, which contained 5 Imperial gallons (23L) of drink. (Note: Almost inevitably, it has been asserted without evidence that anyone famous who visited the inn must have drunk from the punch bowl.) Often broken and repaired, it is now held by Glasgow Museums.

Tennent died bankrupt on 7 February 1757. The inn was next run by his widow, Catherine (née Siddell) or Katherine; then, after her death in 1768, by James Graham; and after his death in 1777, by his widow, Jean (née Leckie). It prospered for many years. Trade fell off with the establishment of newer inns; and in 1791 or 1792, William Miller of Slatefield took it over, and converted it into shops and tenements (apartments). The ballroom was converted into a place of worship for various faiths, and later into a reading room. A ground plan of the former inn and its associated buildings, and of the former chapel and kirkyard, was published in 1872. The main buildings and the former ballroom still existed in 1894. The ballroom was demolished c. 1904, and the main building in 1904 or 1905.

It has been said that John Wesley stayed here. Wesley was in Glasgow 1–6 June 1857, but his diary does not say where he stayed; and this claim lacks good evidence. (Note: Wesley preached against strong drink, but was not a teetotaller; so that it is not impossible that he might have lodged in an inn owned by a brewer,)

Samuel Johnson and James Boswell stayed here during their 1773 tour of Scotland, on the nights of 28 and 29 October. Johnson enjoyed the coal fire. (Note: Johnson had resided the previous two months in buildings smokily heated by peat, which he called a "sullen fuel".) There is a story that during this visit Johnson and Adam Smith engaged in an argument which ended in a swearing-match. Boswell is silent; the story was attested by Walter Scott, on the authority of John Millar; but it was proved to be untrue by John Wilson Croker, who pointed out that Smith was not in Glasgow at the time.

There is an urban legend that Robert Burns drank at the inn during one or more of his visits to Glasgow between 1787 and 1791. (Note: Burns has also been associated with the Saracen's Head Hotel, Beith; about 20 miles (32 km) from Glasgow. The prose introduction to his 1788 poem "Versicles on Sign-posts" mentions "Saracen's head" as an inn sign, but it is unclear whether he was referring to a specific inn or to such signs in general.) It was proved true by the discovery in 2016 at Tennent's brewery of an IOU bearing his seal. (Note: On paying off an IOU, it is customary for the lender to return it to the debtor, who destroys it. The fact that that this document survives suggests that Burns never did.) It is said that the current (fourth) establishment owns a manuscript poem by him which was formerly on display.

A dry extended anecdote in John Donald Carrick's 1835 book The Laird of Logan describes in circumstantial detail a convivial dinner at the Saracen's Head on a freezing evening in the late 1700s.There were nearly a dozen at table in the magistrates' room, and one Dr Seggie drew attention to himself by the novelty of asking for his food to be served on a warm plate. A substantial meal (which included haggis, hare soup, powdered beef, turkey, goose, a pie (unspecified, but presumably savoury), partridge and blackcock) continued into drinking and singing, and the diners were afterwards carried to their homes in sedan chairs (perhaps for practical reasons). The occupation of the author, the strikingly full account of an alcohol-fuelled party alleged to have taken place 40 years before, and the fact that the landlady was said to be an otherwise-unknown Mrs McMillan, suggests that the tale may be tall; even though it has been treated as true.

=== The second establishment ===
This opened in 1803 as The New Saracen's Head Inn, and traded for more than 30 years. For much of that time, it was run by one Charles Howatt, who had been an ostler (stableman) in the original establishment. It was located on the opposite side of the street, on the corner of St Mungo Lane

William Wordsworth, his sister Dorothy, and their friend Samuel Taylor Coleridge stayed here during their 1803 tour of Scotland, on the night of 22 August. Dorothy said that it was a new building, "quiet and tolerably cheap", but compared it somewhat unfavourably to English inns in that it seemed half-unfurnished and that the deal doors and wainscots were unpainted and the floors dirty. (Note: It has been said that as Wordsworth's party's hackney coach left the inn, it was followed for several miles by an admiring crowd of small boys. However, Dorothy's memoir makes it clear that they were travelling in a jaunting car not a hackney, and that such an incident had happened elsewhere, earlier and later in their visit to Glasgow.)

=== The third establishment ===
Nothing seems to be known of this, except that it was located at the corner of Saracen Lane, next to where the first had been.

=== The fourth establishment ===
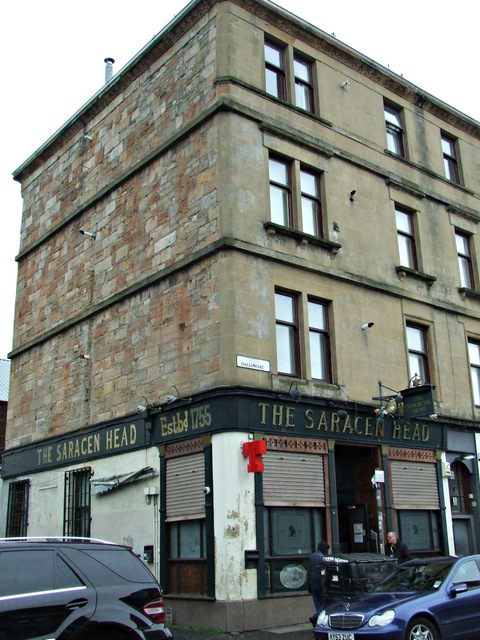
The Saracen Head, 2014

This opened in 1904 as a public house, called The Saracen Head. It is located at 209 Gallowgate, across a street from where the first establishment had been. The signboard claims it was "estbd. 1755"; which, as evidenced above, strictly it was not.

By the 1970s, it had a reputation for being largely patronised by homeless drunks ("jakies") and derelicts. A speciality of the house was White Tornado: dregs and slops poured into a ceramic sherry barrel, available by the pint (Imperial pint, 568 mL). Drips from the barrel had eaten away the floor below. Billy Connolly has remembered those days with something resembling affection. His controversial comedic monologue "The Crucifixion", included on his 1974 album Solo Concert, is set in The Saracen Head. One John Murphy wrote a song about the pub, which includes the words "The girl that I marry will drink in the Sarry, [and] be able to drink more wine than me". Until 1989, it was men-only. In 1991, a BBC film crew took a coach party there.

It closed in 1992, and reopened under new management in 1994 with the original decor but a distinctly more respectable air; with the ashtrays no longer screwed to the tables, and even having for the first time a ladies' lavatory. In 2007, it was reported to be one of the few remaining Glasgow drinking-places which opened only when the proprietor felt like it. A human skull in a display case in the bar is said to be that of Maggie Wall, allegedly the last person burnt as a witch in Scotland (in 1657).
