= Henry Mong =

Henry Mong, also known as Heng Li Henry Mong (孟亨利), was an American surgeon and Presbyterian missionary who built mission hospitals in China.

== Timeline ==
- 1907 – The Presbyterian Church (USA) established the True Faith Hospital in Guangdong, South China. Mong was entrusted with running the mission hospital.
- 1922 – Mong tasked by Presbyterian Board of Foreign Missions to set up a mission hospital in Zhenjiang, Jiangsu, the forerunner of the City's First People's Hospital.
- 1924 – Elected Secretary General of the Red Cross Society of Zhenjiang City.
