= Eastern Mongols =

Eastern Mongols may refer to:

- Buryats, Khalkhas and Inner Mongolians settling in Eastern Greater Mongolia (as opposed to Oirats a.k.a. Western Mongols), the Han Chinese called them “Tatar” during the Ming dynasty
- Khorchin and Kharchin Mongols who mainly settle in south-western Manchuria as farmers and herder-farmers and speak Eastern Mongolian dialects (as opposed to Khalkha and Chahar Mongols who live as pure herders in their west and speak Central Mongolian dialects)
