= Mongolian race =

Mongolian race or Mongol race may refer to:

- Mongols, the indigenous people of Mongolia
- Mongoloid, a historical racial category
