= Bob Mong =

American journalist and academic administrator

Bob Mong is an American journalist and academic administrator. He worked in journalism for 46 years, including as editor of the Dallas Morning News, before being named the third president of University of North Texas at Dallas in July 2015. Mong also oversaw the UNT Dallas College of Law, which moved under the supervision of UNT Dallas on September 1, 2015. He announced his retirement in January 2024 and stepped down as president in July 2024 after nine years in the role.

== Education and early career ==
An Ohio native, Mong graduated in 1971 from Haverford College in Pennsylvania with a bachelor of arts degree. After graduation, he worked two years at the Palladium-Item in Richmond, Indiana, before moving to the Cincinnati Post.

In 1975, Mong went to work as a reporter at The Capital Times in Madison, Wisconsin. Later, when the members of the local Newspaper Guild walked out in a labor dispute, he served as city editor on the Madison Press Connection, a strike newspaper.

== Dallas Morning News career ==
Mong arrived at the Dallas Morning News in 1979 and became the newspaper's business editor in 1980. He was promoted to deputy managing editor in 1982 and managing editor in 1990. In 1996 Mong left the Morning News to become CEO of the Messenger-Inquirer newspaper in Owensboro, Kentucky. He returned to the Dallas Morning News in 1998 as general manager and was named editor in chief in 2001. He retired from journalism in May 2015. The Dallas Morning News received nine Pulitzer Prizes over the period between 1986 and 2010 when Mong was part of the paper's leadership. Mong also served as a Pulitzer Prize juror and chaired Pulitzer committees choosing winners in photography and public service.

== Personal life ==
Mong is married and has one son and one daughter.
