= Jim Bowler =

Australian geologist (born 1930)

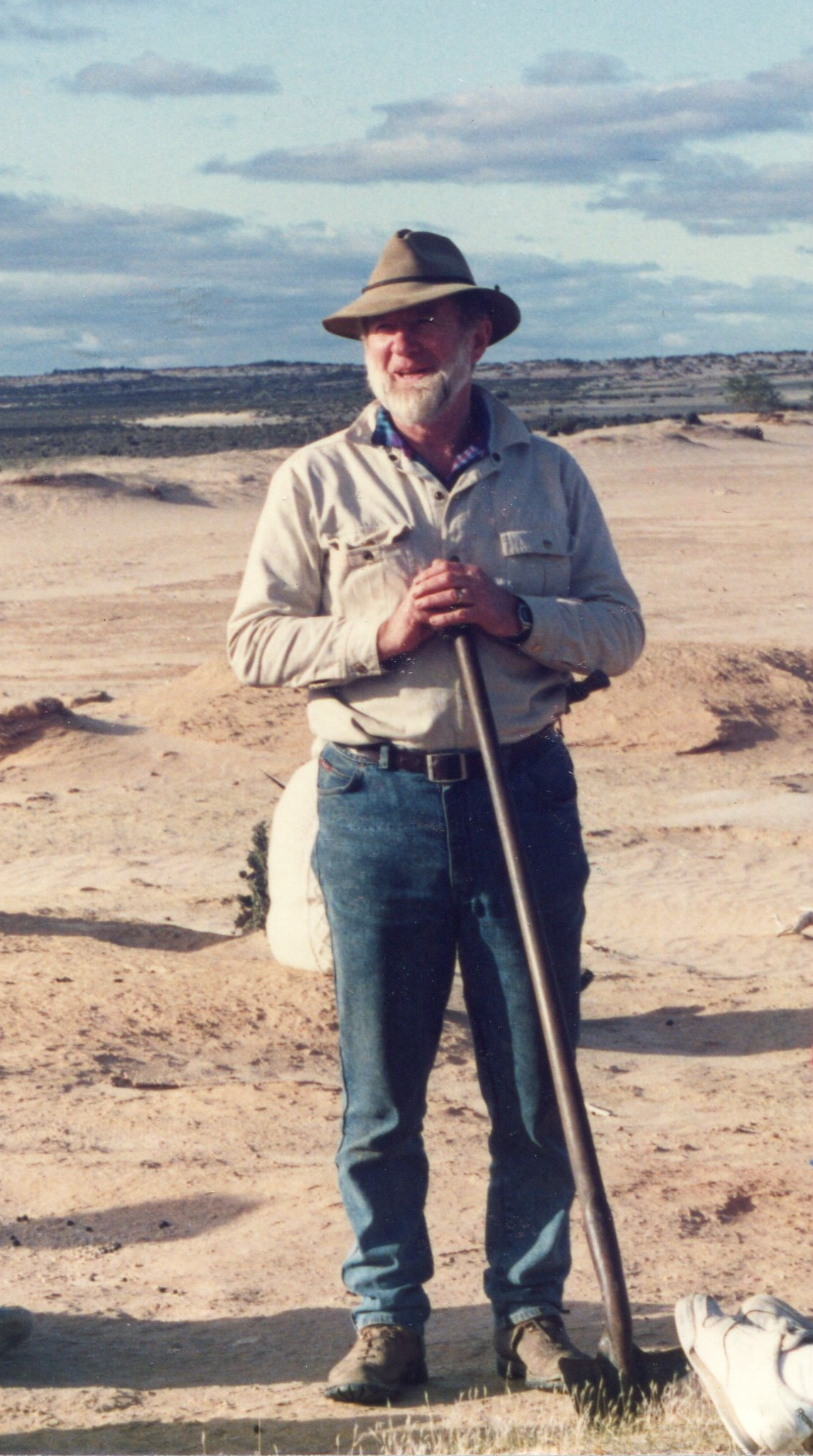
- Jim Bowler at Lake Mungo in 1991.
- Known for: Discovering Lake Mungo remains
- Scientific career
- Workplaces: University of Melbourne

Jim Maurice Bowler AM FAHA (born 1930) is an Australian geologist known for discovering the Lake Mungo remains, which are considered the oldest human remains in Australia. He is a professorial fellow at the University of Melbourne, School of Earth Sciences.

== Early life ==
Bowler’s father was a fisherman who came from Ireland to farm in Leongatha, southern Victoria. He spent his adolescence and young adulthood working as a farmer and rancher, growing potatoes and herding cattle. For a time, he studied to become a Jesuit priest, but gave up and went back to farming.

He left farming in his mid-twenties and enrolled at the University of Melbourne where he studied geology and received a Bachelor of Science degree in 1958, and later, a Masters in 1961. Bowler moved to Canberra in 1965 and became a research fellow at the Australian National University.

He received his PhD in 1970, for his thesis "Late quaternary environments: a study of lakes and associated sediments in south-eastern Australia."

== Lake Mungo remains ==
Bowler made his discovery in western New South Wales in March 1974. At the time, Bowler was in the department of biogeography and geomorphology at the Australian National University. The human remains he found, and their subsequent radiocarbon dating, contributed to the historical rewriting of the timeline for Aboriginal settlement. They have been dated to approximately 40,000 years ago.

== Awards and recognition ==
Bowler was elected a Fellow of the Australian Academy of the Humanities in 1988. He was awarded the Mawson Medal by the Australian Academy of Science in 1989.

He was appointed a Member of the Order of Australia in the 1999 Australia Day Honours for "service to earth sciences, particularly through the study of landscape and environmental history, and to Australian prehistory". Also in 1999, he was elected a Fellow of the Royal Society of Victoria.
