= Maggie Wall =

Scottish woman burned as a witch in 1657

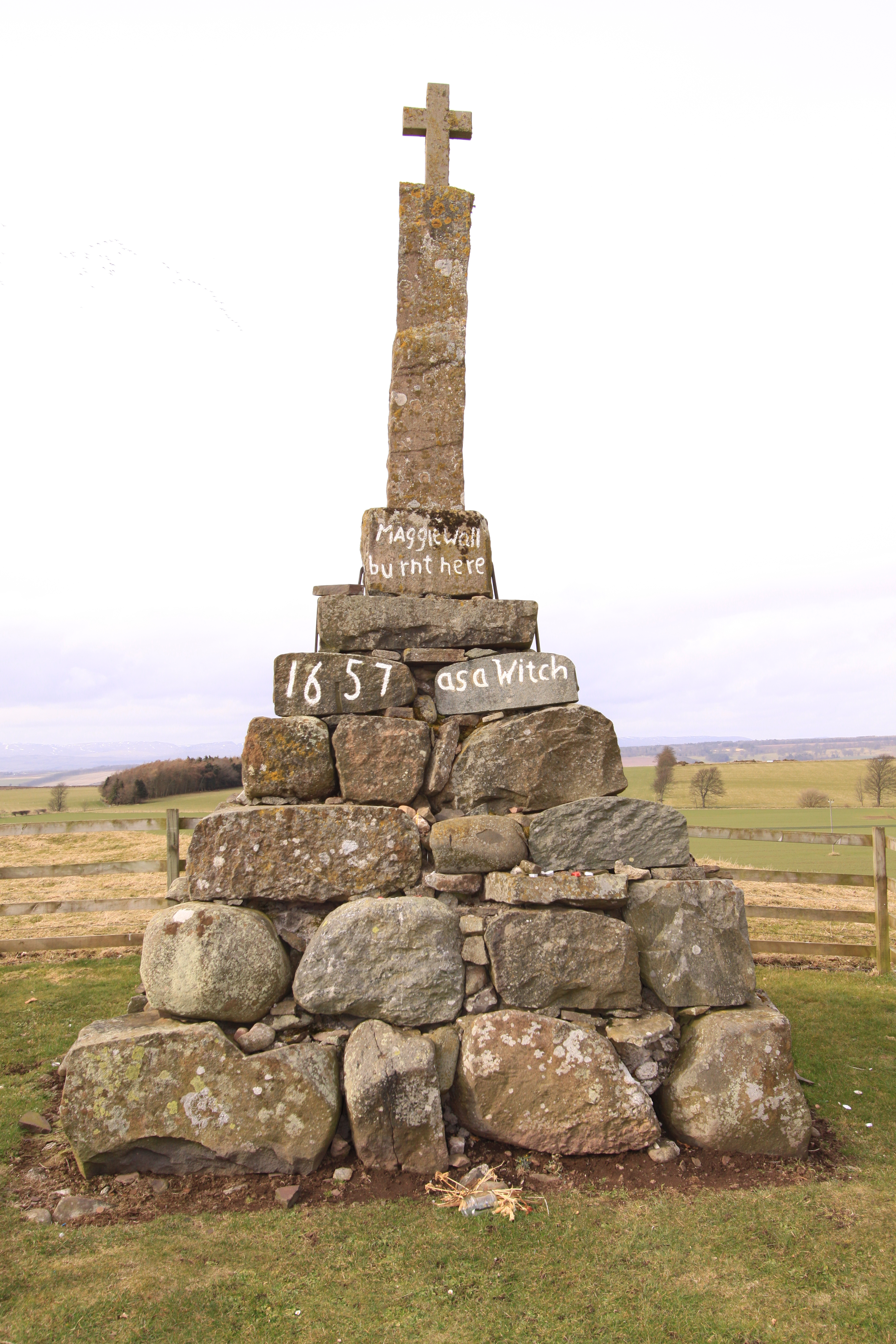
- Maggie Wall monument
- Died: 1657; Dunning, Perthshire
- Cause of death: Burnt as a witch

Maggie Wall (died Perthshire c. 1657), was believed to have been burned as a witch. She is best known for the memorial monument in Dunning, Perthshire inscribed with "Maggie Wall burnt here 1657 as a witch". A skull on display in the Saracen Head pub in Gallowgate, Glasgow, is claimed to be Wall's.

== Life ==
There is no public record of Maggie Wall, the only record of her is in anecdotal accounts and stories; it remains a mystery whether she existed. Wall is believed to have been condemned as a witch in the 17th century, as part of the Scottish Witch Trials.

There are a number of theories about her identity. One theory suggests she was a member of the Rollos family of Duncrub Castle near Dunning, Perthshire. Another suggests she was part of a group of 120 women who attacked a group from the Presbytery of Perth who set out to discipline a minister, Rev. George Muschet. The group of women aimed to protect the Muschet from being disciplined, but it is thought that Wall could have been caught up in this and subsequently burnt as a witch.

== Death ==
When condemned as a witch in Scotland during the witch trials, it was custom to strangle the woman to death before burning them. Records show that around 6–9 women were condemned as witches and were killed in Dunning.

== Monument ==
A memorial monument to Wall is situated approximately 1 mile (1.6 km) west of Dunning. The stone monument is approximately 20 feet (6 m) tall and resembles a cairn. It is topped by a stone cross and bears the painted inscription "Maggie Wall burnt here 1657 as a witch".

The monument is the first known monument erected in memory of a witch in Scotland. The first record of the monument appears around 1800, but exactly when the monument was erected is contested.

Author Geoff Holder tried to shed new light on Maggie Wall and the monument in his book Paranormal Perthshire. Holder concluded that the monument was very likely a folly or cenotaph to all the women burned as witches in Dunning, with Maggie Wall being a composite figure, named after the surrounding fields from historical maps.
