= Little St Mungo's Chapel =

Coordinates: 55°51′20.5″N 4°14′17.0″W

Little St Mungo's Chapel (or, Kirk) was a church in Gallowgate, Glasgow, Scotland. Other names were St Mungo's Beyond the Walls, in the Fields, and Without the Walls. The epithets served to distinguish it from Glasgow Cathedral, also dedicated to St Mungo, the city's patron saint; the chapel was located beyond Gallowgate (or, East) Port, the eastern gate in the city walls.

Around the year 600, St Kentigern (another name for St Mungo) returned to Glasgow from exile in Wales. He preached in the open air to King Redrath and his chiefs and people. In one account, he spoke from a small elevation called Dowhill. In another, the crowd could not hear him, but the ground miraculously upheaved itself to form Dowhill.

The chapel was built on Dowhill (Note: Sometimes called Dovehill.) in 1500 by David Cunningham, (Note: In some of the early sources, Cunninghame.) archdeacon of Argyll and provost of the Collegiate Church of Hamilton, who endowed it with lands and rents. It was surrounded by a churchyard (Scots: kirkyard). Some trees which stood around it were called St Mungo's Trees, and a well by it St Mungo's Well. The well survived into the 20th century. The churchyard was enclosed by a substantial stone wall (Scots: dyke) with "boles". (Note: The meaning of "boles" (in quotation marks in the sources) is unclear. Possibly-relevant meanings in the Oxford English Dictionary include "Anything of a cylindrical shape like the trunk of a tree, as a roll, a pillar", "A small square recess in the wall of a room for holding articles", and "An unglazed aperture in the wall of a castle, cottage, stable, etc. for admitting air or light".) A ground plan of the by-then long-gone chapel and churchyard was published in 1872. It includes a measurement, from which it can be roughly estimated that the chapel was 53 ft × 23 ft (16.2 m × 7.0 m) and the churchyard 95 ft × 79 ft (29 m × 24 m).

Chapel and churchyard then disappear from public record until 1593. Some years before, they had come into the possession of Archibald Lyon, a prosperous merchant; they now passed into the ownership of the Provost and Magistrates (predecessors of the modern Glasgow City Council), who ordered that the chapel be repaired and turned into a hospital for the poor. It may have suffered damage during the anti-clerical zeal of the Scottish Reformation. The intention may have been to create a place outside the city for the seclusion of lepers and victims of plague.

The building seems to have been last mentioned in 1603, but then disappears from the record; although the graveyard continued to be used for burials until the early 18th century. By the middle of that century, the site was overgrown, and said to be eerie, possibly haunted, and best avoided at night.

In 1754, the Provost and Magistrates decided that the site should be utilised for a modern coaching inn. Robert Tennent (Note: In 1740, Robert Tennent and his brother Hugh had founded the Glasgow brewery company H. & R. Tennent, which survives as Tennent Caledonian.) contracted to build one, cleared the site, and in 1755 opened the Saracen's Head Inn; which was the premier inn in Glasgow for some 30 years.
