= Mungo National Park =

National park in New South Wales, Australia

- IUCN category II (national park)
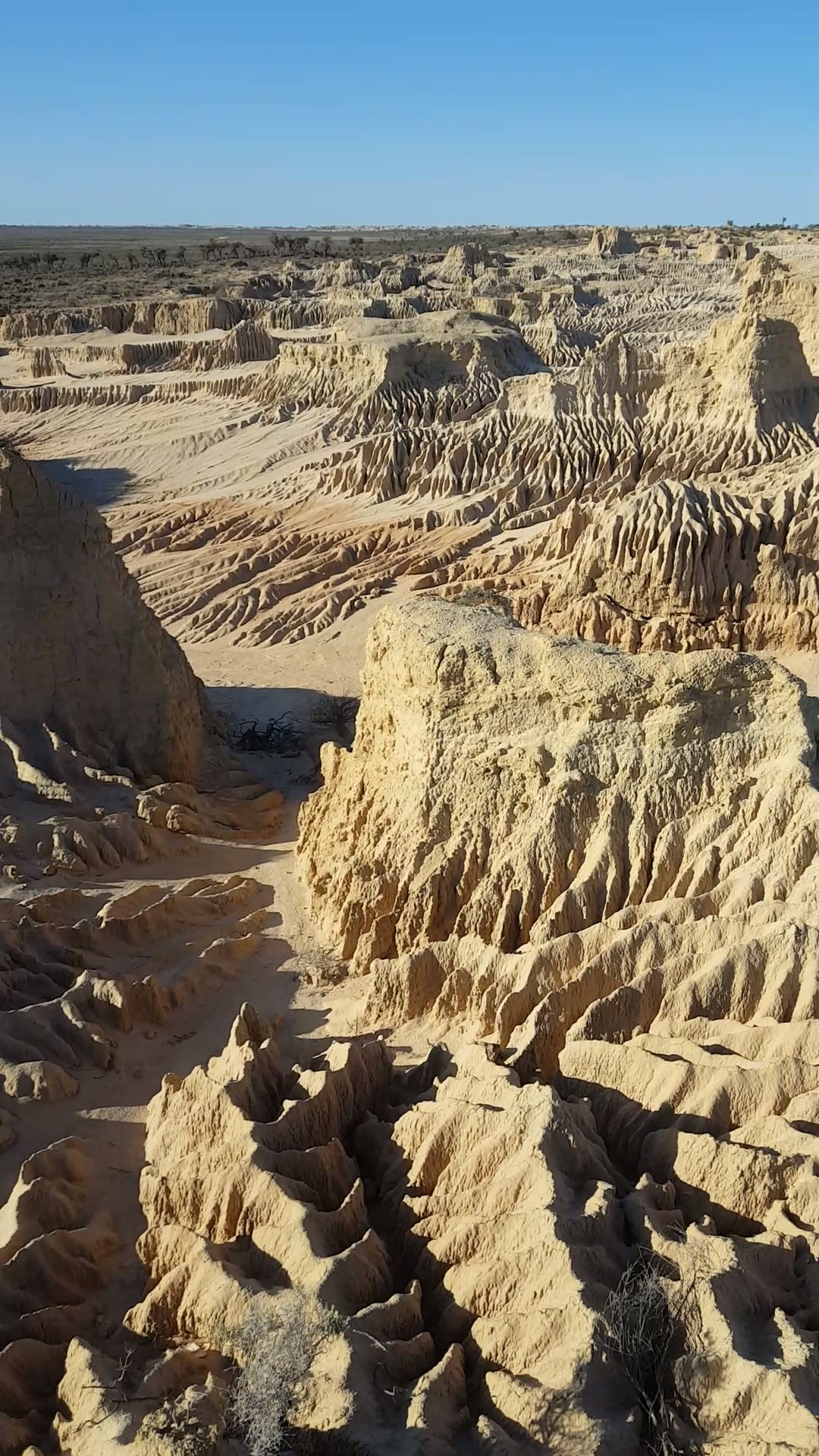
- Red Top Formation viewed from the lookout, looking north toward Wilcannia, 2024.

- Location within New South Wales
- Location: New South Wales
- Nearest city: Pooncarie
- Coordinates: 33°44′56″S 143°08′08″E
- Area: 1,109.67 km^{2} (428.45 sq mi)
- Established: 6 April 1979
- Governing body: NSW National Parks & Wildlife Service
- Website: Official website

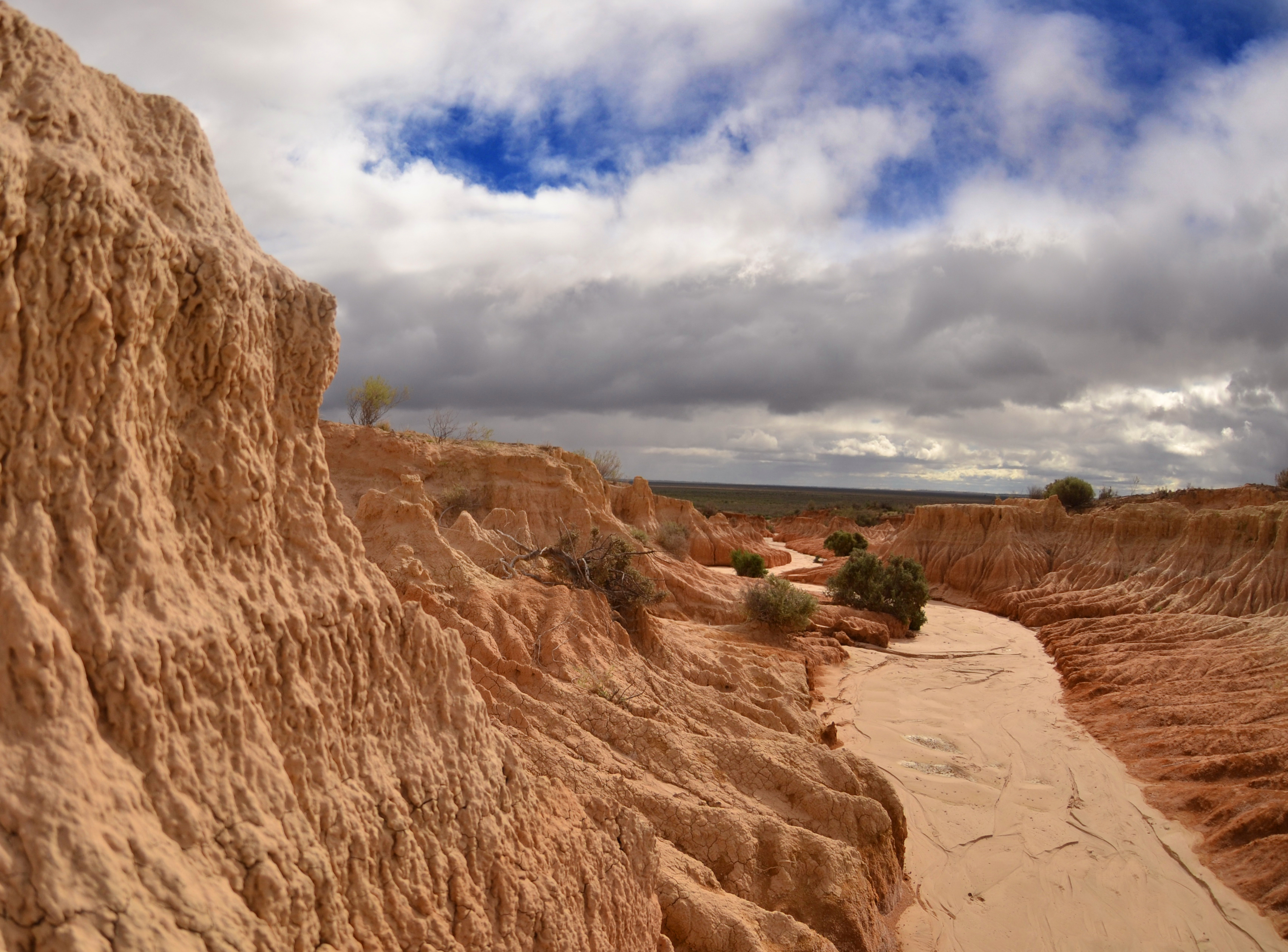

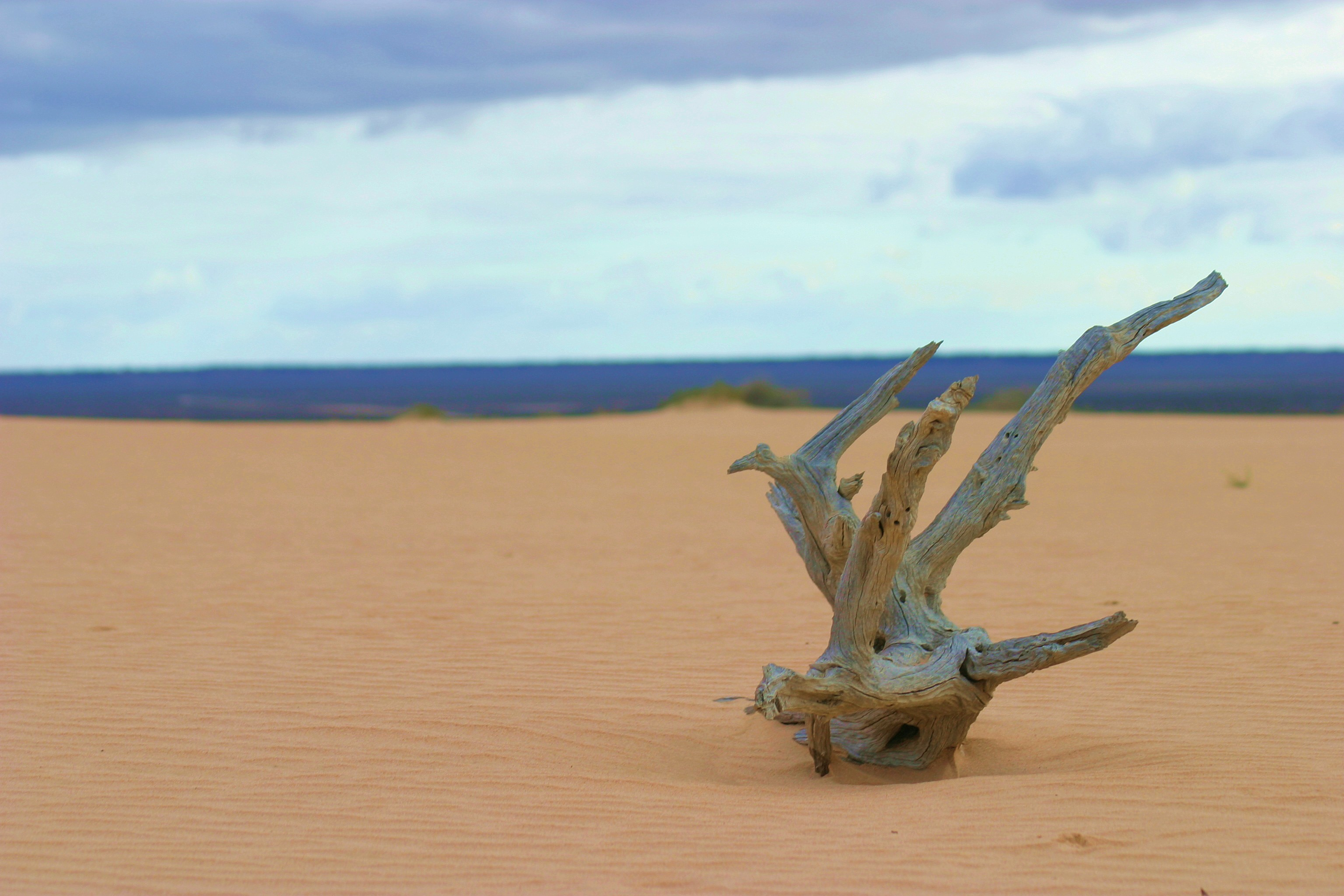
A lone piece of wood atop a sand dune in Mungo National Park, June 2005

Mungo National Park is a protected national park in south-western New South Wales, in eastern Australia. The 110,967-hectare (274,210-acre) national park is situated approximately 875 kilometres (544 mi) west of Sydney in the Balranald Shire.

Mungo National Park is the traditional meeting place of the Muthi Muthi, Nyiampaar and Barkinji Aboriginal nations. People are no longer able to climb the sand dunes by themselves as strict rules have been enforced; all visitors groups need to be accompanied by an accredited tour guide to access the sand dunes.

The national park is part of the UNESCO World Heritage–listed Willandra Lakes Region, an area of 2,400 square kilometres (930 sq mi) that incorporates seventeen dry lakes. The 17 dry lakes are not all called Mungo but are all declared world heritage. The creek that used to flow into Mungo is being preserved as a sacred site. The national park is about 75 kilometres (47 mi) south-east of Pooncarie, 110 kilometres (68 mi) north-east of Mildura and approximately 145 kilometres (90 mi), 90 minutes drive south-west of Ivanhoe. The roads to, in or around the park are unsealed and can be accessed in 2-wheel-drive cars, but councils will close the road in wet weather.

== History ==
The area that in 1979 was declared a National Park is the traditional land of the Barkindji, Ngiyampaa and Mutthi Mutthi. These original inhabitants were driven off by European squatters for their sheep farming in the 1840s, a remnant of which is the 45m woodshed, constructed from Murray pine in 1869 by Chinese labourers. The Aboriginal people who survived the seizure of their homeland, and European-introduced diseases, were moved to a mission at Balranald. Mungo sheep station (15,700 ha.) was subdivided from Gol-Gol holdings after WWI for returned soldiers, the Cameron Brothers, who named it after St Mungo’s Church in Scotland. The station lease included the eastern lake lunette, while a small section at the southern end was covered by Jounli station.

== Features and location ==
The central feature of Mungo National Park is Lake Mungo, the second largest of the ancient dry lakes. The Mungo National Park is noted for the archaeological remains discovered in the park: the remains of Mungo Man, the oldest human remains discovered in Australia, and Mungo Lady, the oldest known human to have been ritually cremated. They were buried on the shore of Lake Mungo, beneath the "Walls of China", a series of lunettes on the south eastern edge of the lake.

The park has a visitor centre near the old Mungo woolshed and the entrance to the park. A 70-kilometre (43 mi) signposted circular vehicle track goes past the Walls of China and around the lakes. The Shearers' Quarters provides paid bunk accommodation. Camping and park access fees may be paid at the visitor centre.

Mungo National Park was acquired for the National Reserve System in 1979 by the Foundation for National Parks and Wildlife. This organisation fundraised the $101,000 required to purchase the property. The Foundation also funded a resident archaeologist to work on the site from 1979 to 1983. With funds donated by Dick Smith, the Foundation established the Mungo Visitors Centre and Laboratory in 1983. With further sponsorship from BHP, the Foundation implemented the Mungo National Park 60-kilometre (37 mi) long guided vehicle drive in 1990. As of 2010, the Foundation put together a prospectus to create a new Centre at Mungo for education and research. Glenn Murcutt, an Australian architect and winner of the 2002 Pritzker Prize and 2009 AIA Gold Medal, along with Wendy Lewin, were scheduled to design the building.

== See also ==
- Protected areas of New South Wales
