= Mong Thongdee =

Mong Thongdee (born c. 1997) is a formerly stateless person from Thailand. He became known in 2008–2009, when he won a national paper plane competition and was chosen to represent Thailand in the All Japan Origami Airplane Competition in Chiba Prefecture. However, being born to Shan migrant worker parents from Myanmar, he did not have Thai nationality, and his stateless status meant that he could not obtain travel documents in order to leave the country. His case became a focus of national attention, and after meeting with Prime Minister Abhisit Vejjajiva, Mong was granted a temporary passport allowing him to travel. He placed third in the singles competition and with two other teammates won the team event for Thailand.

Despite the case raising awareness on the issues facing stateless children in Thailand, and promises of citizenship by government officials, by 2017 Mong still had not obtained Thai nationality. He works as a drone pilot trainer in Chiang Mai. Mong's case resurfaced following the Tham Luang cave rescue in 2018, where several of the boys involved were granted citizenship, and his resubmitted application was approved in October 2018.

== See also ==
- Thai nationality law
