= Mungo (name) =

Mungo is a Scottish masculine given name and, more rarely, a surname. It may refer to:

== Given name ==
- Saint Mungo (died 614), Scottish saint
- Mungo Bovey (born 1959), Scottish lawyer
- Hugh John Mungo Grant (born 1960), English actor
- Mungo Lewis (1894–1969), Canadian politician
- Mungo Wentworth MacCallum (1941–2020), Australian journalist
- Mungo William MacCallum (1854–1942), Australian university president and literary critic
- Mungo Mackay (1740–1811), American privateer and businessman
- Mungo McKay (born 1971), Australian actor
- Mungo Martin (1879–1962), Canadian First Nations sculptor and painter
- Mungo Melvin (born 1955), Scottish major-general and historian
- Mungo Murray, 7th Earl of Mansfield (1900–1971), Scottish politician
- Mungo Murray (clergyman) (1599-1670), Scottish scholar and clergyman
- Mungo Park (explorer) (1771–1806), Scottish explorer of Africa
- Mungo Park (golfer) (1835–1904), Scottish golfer
- Mungo Park Jr. (1877–1960), Scottish golfer and golf course architect
- Mungo Ponton (1801–1880), Scottish inventor
- Mungo Thomson (born 1969), American artist

== Surname ==
- Ray Mungo (born 1946), American writer
- Van Lingle Mungo (1911–1985), American baseball player
