= Mongo =

Mongo may refer to:

== Geography ==
=== Africa ===
- Mongo, Chad, a Sahel city
- Apostolic Vicariate of Mongo, Chad, a Roman Catholic missionary jurisdiction
- Mongo Department, Gabon
- Mongo, Sierra Leone, a chiefdom
- Mongo River (Little Scarces River) - see List of rivers of Guinea and List of rivers of Sierra Leone

=== United States ===
- Mongo, Indiana, an unincorporated community

== Languages ==
- Mongo language, the language of the Mongo people
- Mongo, one of the five languages of the Duala language-cluster, spoken in Cameroon

== People ==
- Mongo people, one of the largest ethnic groups in the Democratic Republic of the Congo
- Mongo Santamaría (1917–2003), Cuban jazz/salsa percussionist
- Mongo Beti (1932–2001), pen name of Cameroonian writer Alexandre Biyidi Awala
- "Mongo", family nickname for Ramón Castro Ruz (1924–2016), eldest brother of Fidel Castro
- Mongo, nickname of musician Drew Parsons (born 1974)
- Mongo, a London-based rapper and founder of hip hop group Mud Family
- Mike Mangold (1955–2015), American airline and former aerobatics pilot whose US Air Force call sign was "Mongo"
- Mark LoMonaco (born 1971), American professional wrestler, one of whose ring names is "Mongo Vyle"
- Steve McMichael (1957-2025), former American football player and professional wrestler whose ring name was "Mongo"

== Fiction ==
- Mongo (Flash Gordon), a fictional setting for the adventures of Flash Gordon
- Magic Mongo, a fictional genie featured in segments of the Saturday morning TV program The Krofft Supershow
- Mongo (Shrek), a fictional giant gingerbread man in the animated movie Shrek 2
- Mongo the Magnificent, a fictional private investigator with dwarfism
- Mongo, a character in the film Precious
- Mongo, a character in the 1974 comedy film Blazing Saddles, played by Alex Karras
- General Mongo, a character in the 1970 Western film Compañeros
- Mongo, a fictional boss character in the game show Nick Arcade
- Mongo, a fictional character in the Dungeon Crawler Carl series

== Other uses ==
- Möngö, a Mongolian monetary unit worth 0.01 Mongolian tögrög
- Mongo (album), a 1959 album by Mongo Santamaría
- Mongo (horse), an American champion thoroughbred racehorse
- MongoDB, a document-oriented database
- Mongo foot, the use of the front foot to propel a skateboard

== See also ==
- Monga (disambiguation)
- Mongol (disambiguation)
- Mungo (disambiguation)
