= Mungo River (New Zealand) =

River in New Zealand

Coordinates: 43°02′S 171°08′E

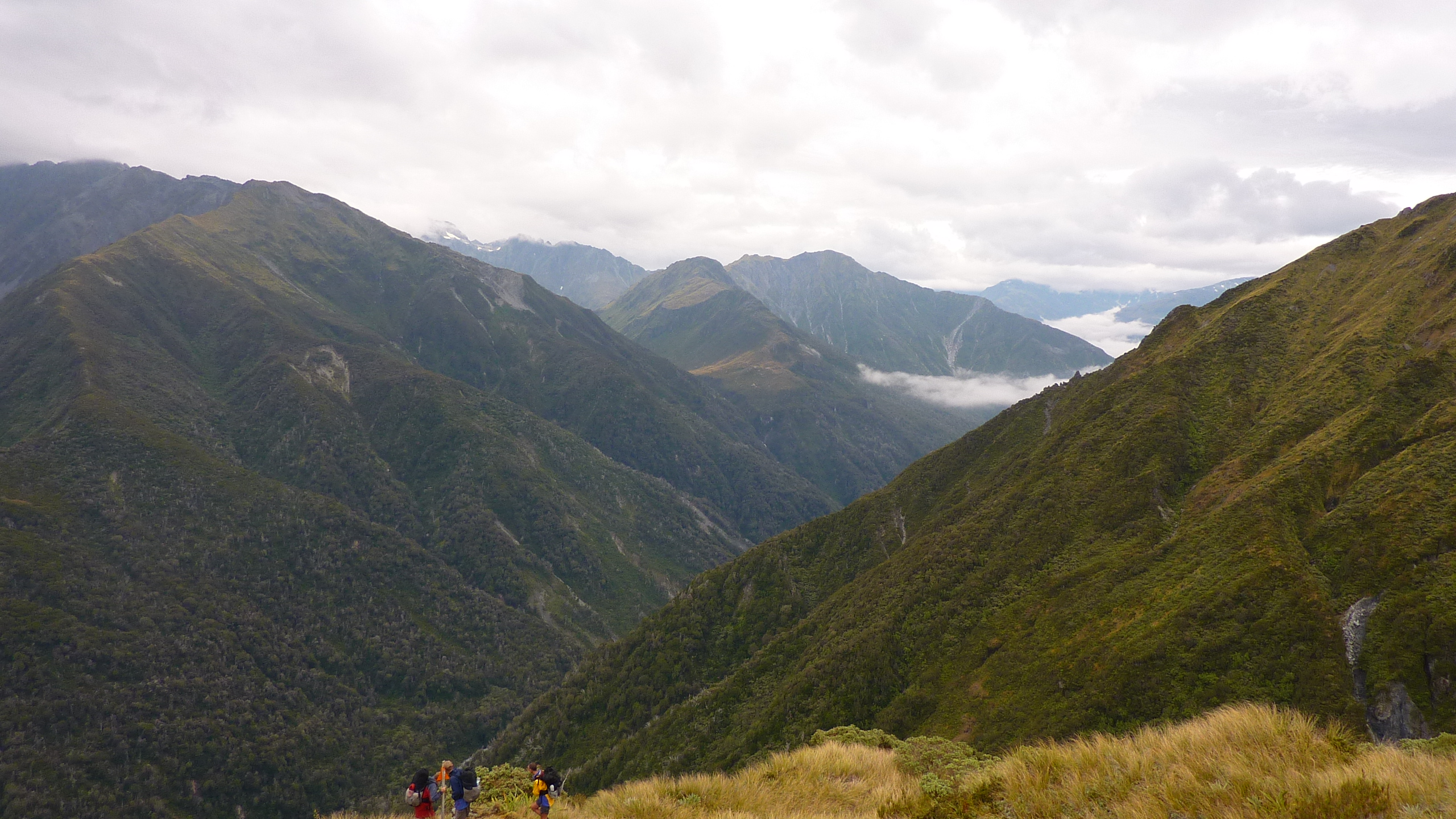
- Mungo River valley

Location
- Country: New Zealand

Physical characteristics
- Source
  - location: Southern Alps
- Mouth
  - location: Hokitika River
- Length: 13 km (8.1 mi)

The Mungo River is a river of the West Coast Region of New Zealand's South Island. The major source of the Hokitika River, it flows generally west from the Southern Alps, becoming the Hokitika River at the point where it turns north as it flows through a gap in the Diedrichs Range. The Hokitika Saddle separates the headwaters of the Mungo from those of the Rakaia River system which flows to the island's east coast.

== See also ==
- List of rivers of New Zealand
