= Mongols (disambiguation) =

Mongols are one or several ethnic groups largely located in Russia, Mongolia and China.

Mongol or Mongols may also refer to:

== History ==
- The Mongol Empire
- Middle Mongol, a language spoken in the Mongol Empire
- Mongol tribe, the origin of the Mongols

== Arts and entertainment ==
- The Mongols (film), a 1961 film by André de Toth
- Mongol (film), a 2007 film by Sergei Bodrov
- The Mongols (band), a Filipino band

== Sports ==
- El Mongol, ring name of Mexican professional wrestler Raul Molina (1930–2016)
- Geeto Mongol, ring name of Canadian professional wrestler Newton Tattrie (1931–2013)
- The Mongol, ring name of American professional wrestler Gene Petit (1949–2013)

== Other uses ==
- Mongols Motorcycle Club, a motorcycle club in the United States and other countries
- Mongol Rally, an international car rally
- Mongol language (Papua New Guinea)
- Mongol, a popular pencil brand by Eberhard Faber
- Mongolism, a former name for the genetic disorder Down's syndrome

== See also ==
- Mongolia (disambiguation)
- Mongolic (disambiguation)
- Mongul, a DC Comics villain
