= Bunurong language =

Extinct Aboriginal language of Victoria, Australia

Bunurong
- Boonwurrung, Boonerwrung
- Bunwurrung
- An excerpt of the papers of William Thomas, a written record of Bunurong language from the 1840s.
- Pronunciation: [ˈbʊn(w)ʊˌɾʊŋ]
- Native to: Australia
- Region: Victoria
- Ethnicity: Bunurong people
- Extinct: early 20th century
- Revival: 1970s to present
- Language family: Pama–Nyungan: Kulinic; Eastern Kulin; Bunurong
- Writing system: Latin

Language codes
- ISO 639-3: None (mis)
- Glottolog: boon1243
- AIATSIS: S35
- ELP: Boonwurrung
- Location of Bunurong Country, where Bunurong language is traditionally spoken, in Victoria

Bunurong (/ˈbʌnəˌrɒŋ/ BUH-nuh-rong) or Boonwurrung (/ˈbuːnwəˌrɒŋ/ or /ˈbʊnwəˌrɒŋ/ BOON-wuh-rung), also spelled Bunwurrung (Aboriginal pronunciation: [ˈbʊn(w)ʊˌɾʊŋ]) and anglicised as Boonerwrung, Boon Wurrung, Bun Wurrung and other variant spellings, is an extinct and reviving Aboriginal Australian language traditionally spoken by the Bunurong peoples of the Kulin nation of central Victoria. It is a Pama–Nyungan language of the Kulinic subbranch. Historically, Bunurong has been considered a dialect of the Woiwurrung–Taungurung or Central Kulin language on the basis of lexicostatistical comparison with Woiwurrung and Taungurung. However, more recent research has suggested that Bunurong may constitute a distinct language rather than a dialect.

The last remaining traditional native speakers died in the early 20th century. A dictionary of the language is being produced.

== Language name ==
Bunurong was not a written language prior to the arrival of Europeans in the 19th century. At least sixty variant spellings for the language name exist, coming from various colonial sources. Today, three common spellings are in use - Bunurong, Boonwurrung, and Bunwurrung. All are ultimately different spellings of what was probably a single historic pronunciation, reconstructed as /ˈbʊn(w)ʊˌrʊŋ/.

In the 21st century, there have been two concurrent community-led revival projects for the language (see below). The names Bunurong and Bunwurrung are used by the Bunurong Land Council Aboriginal Corporation for the language, while the spelling Boonwurrung is used by the Boon Wurrung Foundation. All three names are in active use by various descendant groups of Bunurong peoples today.

It is often claimed that the name Bunurong/Bunwurrung/Boonwurrung is derived from a word bun/boon for 'no' and wurrung 'lips'. This is a pattern of language names common across Victoria as a kind of shibboleth ethnonym. However, there is no historic evidence that a word bun/boon was used to mean 'no' in the Bunurong language of the 19th century. It is possible, however, that bun/boon meant 'no' in an older form of the language.

== History ==
=== Prior to European contact ===
Bunurong language was traditionally spoken across Bunurong Country for thousands of years prior to the arrival of Europeans in the 19th century. Bunurong language is considered to belong to Bunurong Country, with Bunurong peoples as its custodians. Custodianship of language was likely traditionally inherited from one's father as part of the Kulin moiety system.

As for many other Aboriginal peoples across Australia, Bunurong peoples would have likely been highly multilingual, speaking neighbouring languages such as Woiwurrung and Wadawurrung in addition to Bunurong.

Bunurong peoples witnessed the flooding of Port Phillip Bay approximately 1000 years ago. Stories of the flooding have survived in Bunurong language and culture to the present day.

=== 19th century decline ===
Bunurong language began to decline with the arrival of Europeans on Bunurong Country in 1803. Intergenerational transmission of language was severely affected by collapsing populations, kidnappings, and assimilationalist policies.

Eight of every ten Aboriginal people in Victoria died over the 19th century as a result of disease, frontier violence, starvation, and collapsing birth rates. Bunurong women and children were also kidnapped by sealers in the Bass Strait and taken away from Country, to the Bass Strait Islands, South Australia, or Western Australia. While some of those kidnapped, such as Yonki Yonka, managed to return to Country, many could not. All Bunurong or Boonwurrung people today are descended from women who were kidnapped and removed from Bunurong Country by European sealers. It is in these families that some Bunurong language has survived to the present day.

Under the Aboriginal Protectorate (1838-1849), several Europeans were responsible for learning and recording Bunurong language. These included William Thomas and George Augustus Robinson, who created significant records of Bunurong language. Other early recorders of Bunurong language include Edward Micklethwaite Curr, Alfred William Howitt, John Mathew, Robert Hamilton Mathews, and Georgiana McCrae, among others. These Europeans learned language from prominent Bunurong leaders at the time, including Derrimut, Benbenjie, Budgery Tom, and King Benbow.

The last fluent native speakers of Bunurong language died some time in the early 20th century. Surviving Bunurong descendants in Victoria and elsewhere were forced to speak English.

=== Contemporary revival ===
Bunurong language has been undergoing community-led language revitalization since the 1970s. The first formal linguistic reconstruction of the language from 19th-century sources was published by Barry Blake in 1991. Further linguistic research recovering language knowledge from 19th-century materials is underway.

In the 21st century, there have been two concurrent community-led revival projects for the language. One has been led by Carolyn Briggs, Fay Stewart-Muir, and other descendants of Louisa Briggs as part of the Boon Wurrung Foundation, later the Boonwurrung Land and Sea Council and Biik Bundjil. This group identifies with the name Boonwurrung and uses this name for the language. The second has been led by the Ngawak Ngul Language Working Group of the Bunurong Land Council Aboriginal Corporation, the Registered Aboriginal Party representing Bunurong Boonwurrung peoples in the state of Victoria. This group identifies with the names Bunurong or Bunwurrung and uses these names for the language. Both groups have at various times been supported by the Victorian Aboriginal Corporation for Languages, the peak body for Aboriginal languages in the state of Victoria.

A Bunurong language dictionary is currently being developed. Both the Boonwurrung and Bunurong language programs are also running regular language classes to support language revival.

== Geographic distribution ==
Bunurong was spoken by six clans from the Werribee River to Wilsons Promontory in the south of what is now the state of Victoria. These six clans are:

Bunurong Clans
Clan name (Bunurong spelling)	Clan name (Boonwurrung spelling)	Clan name (Ian Clark spellings)	Meaning	Location
Yalukuyt Wilam	Yalukut Wilam	Yalukit Willam	"people between the rivers"	east of the Werribee River, south of the Maribyrnong River and Yarra River to St Kilda
Maayun Bulak	Mayune Buluk	Mayune Balug/Mayone Baluk	"people of Maayun"	from the Carrum Swamp to what is now Cranbourne, including Frankston
Buniyung Bulak	Boonwurrung Buluk	Bun Wurrung Balug/Boonwurung Baluk	"people of Buniyung"	the Mornington Peninsula south of Frankston, including Point Nepean and Cape Schanck
Ngarrk Wilam	Ngaruk Wilam	Ngaruk Willam	"people of the mountains"	Dandenong and the southern foothills of the Dandenong Ranges
Yaluk Bulak	Yaluk Buluk	Yallock Ballug/Yallock Baluk	"people of the rivers"	the east and north coasts of Western Port, including Phillip Island
Yawangdjirri	Yawen Djirra	Yowengarra	"people of the granite"	from the Tarwin River to Wilsons Promontory

== Classification ==
Until very recently, Bunurong was considered as closely related to the Woiwurrung–Taungurung language. On the basis of Blake's (1991) description that Bunurong shares 93% of its vocabulary with Woiwurrung and 80% of its vocabulary with Taungurung, Woiwurrung, Taungurong and Boonwurrung were considered by linguists to be dialects of a single Central Victorian language, whose range stretched from almost Echuca in the north, to Wilsons Promontory in the south.

Blake's lexicostatistical data are supported by various claims in the 19th century as to the similarity of the Bunurong and Woiwurrung languages:

The dialects of the Wooeewoorong or Wawoorong tribe (River Yarra) and the Boonoorong tribe (Coast) are the same. Twenty-three words out of thirty are, making allowances for differences of spelling and pronunciation, identical; five have evidently the same roots, and only two are widely different

— Robert Brough Smythe, The Aborigines of Victoria, 13

More recently, however, further historic records of language attributable to Bunurong people have been found which share only approximately 30% of their vocabulary with Woiwurrung. This makes the classification of Bunurong less certain. While certainly a Kulin language, it is unclear if it is part of the same subfamily as Woiwurrung and Taungurung, as Wadawurrung, or is in its own subgroup entirely.

== Phonology ==
=== Phonemes ===
The Bunurong language has a consonant inventory that is fairly standard for a Pama–Nyungan language, contrasting labial, apical, laminal, and dorsal places of articulation. It is not clear if there is a phonemic contrast between dental and palatal consonants or if these are allophones of a single laminal consonant. It is also not clear if there is more than one lateral consonant or the exact quality of the two rhotic consonants. Stops are typically voiced except word-finally, where they are most often realised as voiceless and as unreleased.

The consonants of Bunurong are given below. Allophones or unreliably attested phonemes are given in brackets.

Consonants in Bunurong
	Labial	Apical		Laminal		Dorsal
	Labial	Alveolar	Retroflex	Dental	Palatal	Velar
Plosive	b (p)	d (t)	ɖ (ʈ)	d̪ (t̪~ɟ~c)		g (k)
Nasal	m	n	ɳ	n̪ (ɲ)		ŋ
Lateral		l	(ɭ)			
Rhotic		r (ɾ)	ɻ			
Glide	<w>				j	<w>

There are at least three vowels - a high front /i/, high back /u/, and a low central /a/. These vowels occur in both short and long forms, although it is not clear if vowel length is phonemic or phonetically-conditioned based on stress. There are possibly phonemic /e/ and /o/ vowels.

Vowels in Bunurong
	Front		Mid		Back	
	Short	Long	Short	Long	Short	Long
Close	i	iː			u	uː
	(e)				(o)	
Open			a	aː		

== Orthography ==
The Bunurong and Boonwurrung language revival groups use separate orthographies for reawakening language. The Bunurong orthography is given below, along with its approximate International Phonetic Alphabet equivalents.

Bunurong Orthography (Spelling System)
IPA	Bunurong orthography	Approximate English equivalent
a	a	u as in bud
aː	aa	a as in father
b	b	b as in book
d	d	d as in dock
d̪~t̪	dh yt (word finally only)	d as in width
ɟ~c	dj (before 'e' or 'i' only)	j as in jam
e	e	e as in bed
g	g (word medially only)	g as in guy
i	i	i as in bid
iː	ii	ea as in bead
k	k	k as in sky
l	l	l as in look
m	m	m as in mess
n	n	n as in not
ŋ	ng	ng as in sing
n̪	nh	n as in ninth
ɲ	nh	ny as in canyon
p	p (word finally only)	p as in spot
ɻ	r	r as in red
ɖ	rd	rd as in American English heard
ɳ	rn	rn as in American English burn
r~ɾ	rr	a trilled r, as in Spanish or Italian
ʈ	rt (word finally only)	rt as in American English hurt
t	t (word finally only)	t as in stock
u	u	u as in bush
uː	uu	u as in bush, but longer
w	w	w as in water
y	y	y as in yellow

== Placenames derived from Bunurong language terms ==
Placename	Origin
Allambee	Reported to mean "to sit and wait for a while", possibly from the verb ngalamba.
Buln Buln	"Lyrebird", same origin as the name of the Melbourne suburb Bulleen and the Bolin Bolin Billabong.
Corinella	Unclear, some sources state "Running Water" whereas others claim "Home of the kangaroo"
Dandenong	Possibly derived from Tanjenong, the indigenous name of Dandenong Creek.
Darnum	Debated, some sources claim "Parrot", referring specifically to the crimson rosella. However, other sources claim this to be folk etymology.
Eumemmerring	Claimed to be a word meaning "agreement", early settler reports recorded "um um" as a word for "yes".
Korumburra	Thought to mean "Blowfly", recorded as karrakarrak in related languages.
Monomeith	From monomeeth, meaning "good" or "pleasant".
Moorabbin	Unclear, possibly "woman's milk". Other sources state "resting place", or "people of the flat country."
Mordialloc	From Moordy Yallock. Yallock means creek or river, in reference to the Mordialloc Creek estuary. Some sources give "moordy" as meaning "small", whereas other sources have given it to mean "swamp".
Murrumbeena	Unclear, according to some sources named after a member of the native police. Identical with the word Murrumbeena recorded by Daniel Bunce in 1851 as meaning "you".
Tooradin	Named from a Bunyip-like monster of local legend, which lived in the waters of Sawtell Inlet and Koo Wee Rup Swamp.
Warragul	A loanword originating from Dharug language around Sydney. Usually given as meaning "wild dog", although warragul was recorded as meaning "wild" for anything, including humans. Gippsland settlers used the word in derogatory way to describe Indigenous people.
Yarragon	Thought to be short for Yarragondock, meaning moustaches.

== Vocabulary ==
Some Bunurong words and phrases include:

Bunurong words and phrases
English	Bunurong
welcome	wumindjika
hello	wawa
goodbye/I'll see you later	mulugu
where are you going?	windharra yanunharr?
I'm going home	yanunhan wilamuyt
no	burrak
yes	nga-ye
what is your name?	nhurrudin nharrinina?
come here	nhalinggu
let's all go	yanunganhin
fire	kuunh
firewood	kuunh kalk
smoke	darrm
ashes	maniip
hot weather	wulun
cold weather	maying
wind	darrmdrim
rain	marrak
sun	nhawiinh
moon	brambuuk
star	durt
Seven Sisters	Karratkurrk
sky	wurrwurr
Milky Way	dharn
cloud	laak
hand	marnang
elbow	kurrung
eye	mirng
nose	kawung
mouth	wurrung
thigh	murriin
foot	djinang
head	burrp
knee	bun
shoulder	bagarra
ear	darriyt
tree	dharrang
fish	duwit
bird	kuyapkuyap
goanna	berranan
grey kangaroo	kuyim
emu	kulap
magpie	barrwang
water	baanh
dog	kal
today	yalingwa
tomorrow	bayiburunh
mother	barndin
father	marndin
brother	wurndhulang
sister	liwurrk
child	bubup
bone	nhilng
money	dharndardabil

== Notes ==
1.This is a traditional place name in what is now Cranbourne.
2.This is a traditional place name in what is now Boneo.
