= Bunurong =

Australian Aboriginal people of the Kulin nation

- Location of Bunurong Country in Victoria

Regions with significant populations
- Port Phillip; Western Port; Pre contact – at least 500.

Languages
- Bunurong language, English

Religion
- Australian Aboriginal mythology

Related ethnic groups
- Woiwurrung, Wathaurong, Taungurong, Djadjawurrung

The Bunurong, also spelt Bun wurrung or Boonwurrung, are an Aboriginal people of the Kulin nation, who are the traditional owners of the land from the Werribee River to Wilsons Promontory in the Australian state of Victoria. Their territory includes part of what is now the city and suburbs of Melbourne. They were called the Western Port or Port Philip tribe by the early settlers, and were in alliance with other tribes in the Kulin nation, having particularly strong ties to the Wurundjeri people.

The Registered Aboriginal Party representing the Bunurong people is the Bunurong Land Council Aboriginal Corporation.

== Language ==
Bunurong is one of the Kulin languages, and belongs to the Pama-Nyungan language family. The ethnonym occasionally used in early writings to refer to the Bunurong, namely Bunwurru, is derived from the word bu꞉n, meaning "no" and wur꞉u, signifying either "lip" or "speech".

== Country ==
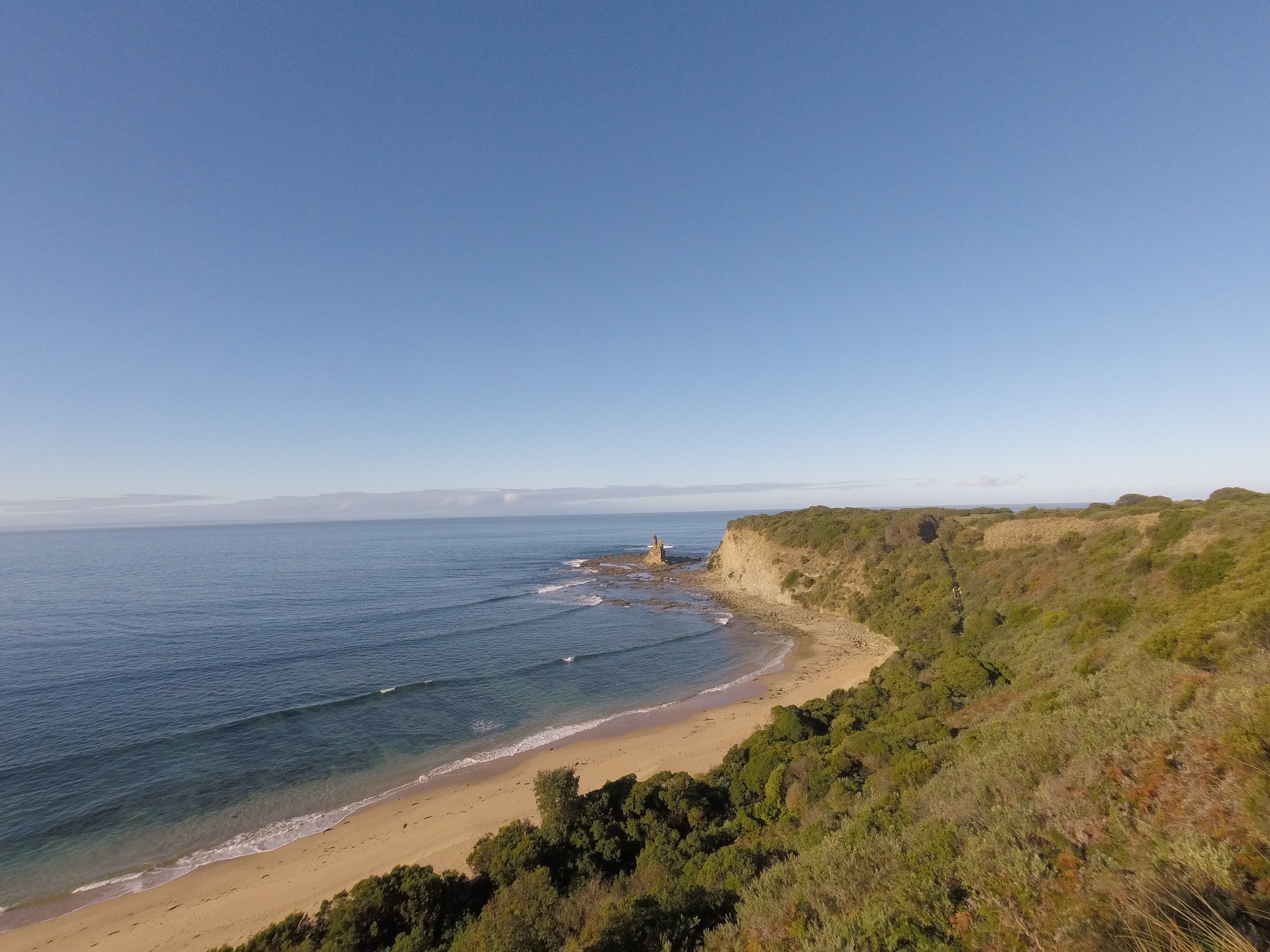
Eagles Nest in Bunurong Marine National Park, part of Bunurong country

The Bunurong people are predominantly saltwater people whose lands, waters, and cosmos encompassed some 3,000 square miles (7,800 km^{2}) of territory around Western Port Bay and the Mornington Peninsula. (Note: 'The Wawoorong or Yarra tribe claimed the lands included within the basin of the River Yarra; all waters flowing into it were theirs, and the boundaries were the dividing ranges on the north, east, and south. The Boonoorong or Coast tribe claimed in the same way all the country lying to the south of the southern rim of the Yarra basin, eastwards from the Tarwin River to Port Phillip Bay, and southwards to the sea. In 1838 there were 205 members of the Wawoorong tribe, and 87 of the Boonoorong tribe.')Its western boundary was set at Werribee. To the southeast, it extended from Mordialloc through to Anderson Inlet, as far as Wilson's Promontory. Inland its borders reached the Dandenong Ranges, and ran eastwards as far as the vicinity of Warragul.

“Saw nothing but grassy country, open forest, plenty gum and wild cherry. Saw where the natives had encamped, plenty of trees notched where they had climbed for opossums...there are herds of forest kangaroo immensely large...also flocks of emus on the western plains fifty and sixty in a drove...the country through which I travelled to the Salt Water (Maribyrnong) River had a park-like appearance, kangaroo grass being the principal, the trees she-oak, wattle, honeysuckle. Numerous old native huts.”

— George Augustus Robinson, Chief protector, Port Phillip Aboriginal Protectorate.

In June 2021, the Bunurong Land Council Aboriginal Corporation and the Wurundjeri Woi Wurrung Cultural Heritage Aboriginal Corporation, both registered Aboriginal Parties, agreed on a redrawing of their traditional boundaries developed by the Victorian Aboriginal Heritage Council. The new borderline runs across the city from west to east, with the CBD, Richmond and Hawthorn included in Wurundjeri land, and Albert Park, St Kilda and Caulfield on Bunurong land. It was agreed that Mount Cottrell, the site of a massacre in 1836 with at least 10 Wathaurong victims, would be jointly managed above the 160 m (520 ft) line. However these new boundaries are disputed by some Wurundjeri and Bunurong people, including N'arweet Carolyn Briggs of the Bunurong Land and Sea Council.

In Bunurong belief, their territory was carved out by the creator Loo-errn as he moved from Yarra Flats down to his final resting place at Wamoon and, as custodians of this marr-ne-beek country, they required outsiders to observe certain ritual prohibitions and to learn their language if the newcomers were to enter their land without harm.

== Clan structures ==
Communities consisted of six land-owning groups called clans that spoke the Bunurong language and were connected through cultural and mutual interests, totems, trading initiatives, and marriage ties. Each had an Arweet, or clan leader.

The clans are:

- Yalukit-willam: East of Werribee River to St Kilda
- Mayone-bulluk: Carrum Carrum Swamp
- Ngaruk-Willam: Brighton, Mordialloc, Dandenong, and the area from Mount Martha to Mount Eliza
- Yallock-Bullock: Bass River and Tooradin
- Bunurong-Bulluk: Point Nepean to Cape Schank
- Yowenjerre: Tarwin River

Access by other clans to land and resources (such as the Birrarung, or Yarra River) was sometimes restricted depending on the state of the resource in question. For example; if a river or creek had been fished regularly throughout the fishing season and fish supplies were down, fishing was limited or stopped entirely by the clan who owned that resource until fish were given a chance to recover. During this time, other resources were utilised for food. This ensured the sustained use of the resources available to them. As with most other Kulin territories, penalties such as spearings were enforced upon trespassers.

Bunurong moieties classified people either as Bunjil, that is eaglehawk, or Waang, namely raven.

== Culture ==
=== Traditional life ===
Information on traditional life has been passed down by Bunurong people from one generation to the next, and was also recorded by European settlers and administrators.

The Yalukit-willam clan of the Bunurong were semi-nomadic hunter gatherers who moved around to seasonal food sources in their territory to take advantage of seasonably available food resources. Their hunting equipment and techniques had been highly developed to the environment and they had a highly detailed knowledge of their Country. This knowledge was passed from one generation to the next. They had to work only about five hours a day. Dogs were important and ceremonially buried. (Note: 'Samuel Rawson, a squatter southeast of Melbourne in the mid-nineteenth century, who stated he shot some dogs in retribution for the dogs killing his poultry. Rawson noted in his diary the calamitous effect this had on the dogs’ Aboriginal owners: “they buried the dead bodies of their four legged companions with great ceremony, wrapping them in blankets and sheets of bark & lighting fires by their graves after which they decamped & moved up the river” . This is affirmed by William Thomas, an Assistant Protector of Aborigines of Port Phillip at the time, who recorded that Victorian Aboriginal people performed mortuary ceremonies for their dogs.')

The Bunurong people have oral histories that recount in detail the flooding of Port Phillip Bay ten-thousand years ago. The boundaries of Bunurong territory are defined by further floods 5000 years ago. Prior to this time, the bay was scrub-filled and passable on foot, and the Bunurong people hunted kangaroo and possums on it.

==== Food and hunting ====
The Yalukit-willam would spend up to a few weeks in one spot, depending on the water and food supply. Major camps were often set up close to permanent fresh water, leaving archaeological evidence of the places they lived. These archaeological sites include surface scatters, shell middens, isolated artefacts and burials.

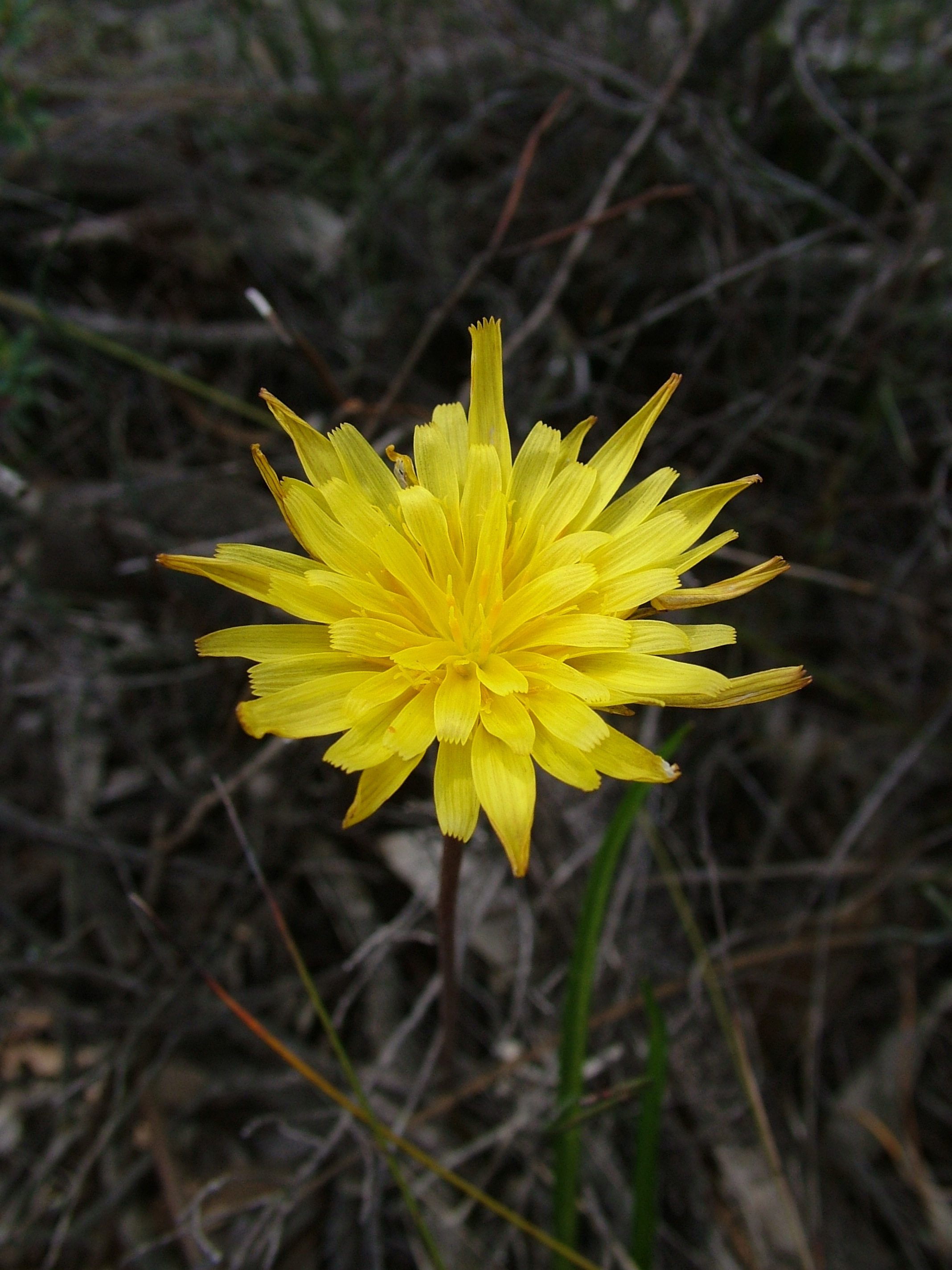
Murnong (yam daisy)

Men were the primary hunters. They hunted kangaroos, possums, kangaroo rats, bandicoots, wombats and lizards. They also caught fish and eels and collected shellfish. The Yallock-Bullock Bunurong made seasonal trips in canoes to French Island, where they harvested seal and mutton birds. (Note: 'the largest canoes made by the natives of Victoria are about eighteen feet in length; and a vessel of that size «ill carry five or six men, or more. The late Mr. Thomas saw the natives crossing the strait between the mainland and French Island in a canoe in which there were four persons.') In coastal and swamp areas there was plenty of bird life to hunt, including ducks and swans. There were abundant eels, yabbies, and fish in Stony and Kororoit creeks, and the Yarra River. Men were experts at spearing eels and Robinson notes in his diary in 1841 two men catching 40lbs of eel "in a very short time". The coast provided saltwater fish, mussels, cockles and small crabs.

Women were primarily gatherers. Murnong (or yam daisy) was a favourite food. Others were the black wattle gum, the pith of tree ferns, native cherries, kangaroo apples and various fungi. Murnong grew all year was best eaten in spring. Tubers were collected in vast amounts in string bags. Fresh murnong could be eaten raw, or if less fresh, murnong could be roasted or baked in earth ovens. Murnong used to grow in great amounts along the Kororoit Creek and other creeks in the area and covered the plain to the west. These murnong fields were destroyed by the introduction of sheep. Scholar Bruce Pascoe attributes the widespread fields of murrnong in certain areas to active farming by Aboriginal peoples. Women collected large quantities of tadpoles which were cooked beneath a bed of hot coals.

Robinson's diary describes how the Yalukit-willam caught emus and restrained their dingos.

When the natives want to kill emu they get up a cherry tree before daylight with a large spear, and having put a quantity of

cherries in a certain spot under the tree, conceal themselves above with a clear place for them to thrust the spear down. At day dawn the emu is heard coming by the noise it makes, and if this is a tree they have been at before they are sure

to come again, when they begin eating, and then the native thrusts the spear through them. …Saw several wild dogs on the settlement belonging to the country. …The aborigines tie up the fore foot of their dogs to prevent them going astray, instead of roping them round the neck as we do. At the native encampment, I saw two dogs thus tied.

— George Robinson 1840. The journals of George Augustus Robinson, chief protector, Port Phillip Aboriginal Protectorate.

==== Law and war ====
Great enmity existed in particular between the Bunurong and the eastern Gunai, who were later deemed responsible for playing a role in the drastic reduction of the tribe's population. According to William Barak, the last traditional elder of the Wurundjeri people, the Bunurong were involved in a long-running dispute with the Gunai/Kurnai people from Gippsland over resources and women. The Yowengerra clan had almost been completely annihilated by 1836, largely as a result of attacks from the Gunai. During 1833–34, around 60–70 Bunurong people, if a report has been correctly interpreted, may have been killed in a raid by Gunai when they were camped to the north of Carrum Carrum Swamp.

Injury or death to a tribal member usually resulted in a conference to assess the facts, and, where thought unlawful, revenge was taken. In 1839, after one or two Bunurong/Woiwurrung were killed, a party of 15 men left for Geelong in order to retaliate against the malefactors, the Wathaurong. In 1840, the Bunurong became convinced that a man from a tribe in Echuca had used sorcery to ordain the death of one of their warriors, whose name had been sung while a possum bone discarded after a Bunurong meal, and encased in a kangaroo's leg bone, was roasted. Shortly afterward the named Bunurong man died, and the tribe revenged itself on the first Echuca tribesman who then came to visit their territory. It was arranged by word of mouth, passing from Echuca through the Nirababaluk and Wurundjeri, for a meeting to have justice done at Merri Creek. Nine or ten of the killed Echuca tribesman's kinsmen threw spears and boomerangs at the Bunurong warrior, armed with a shield, until he was wounded in the flank by a reed-spear. An elder of another, observing tribe, the Barababaraba, called it a day, the ordeal ended, and all celebrated a grand corroboree.

==== Bunurong Dreaming ====
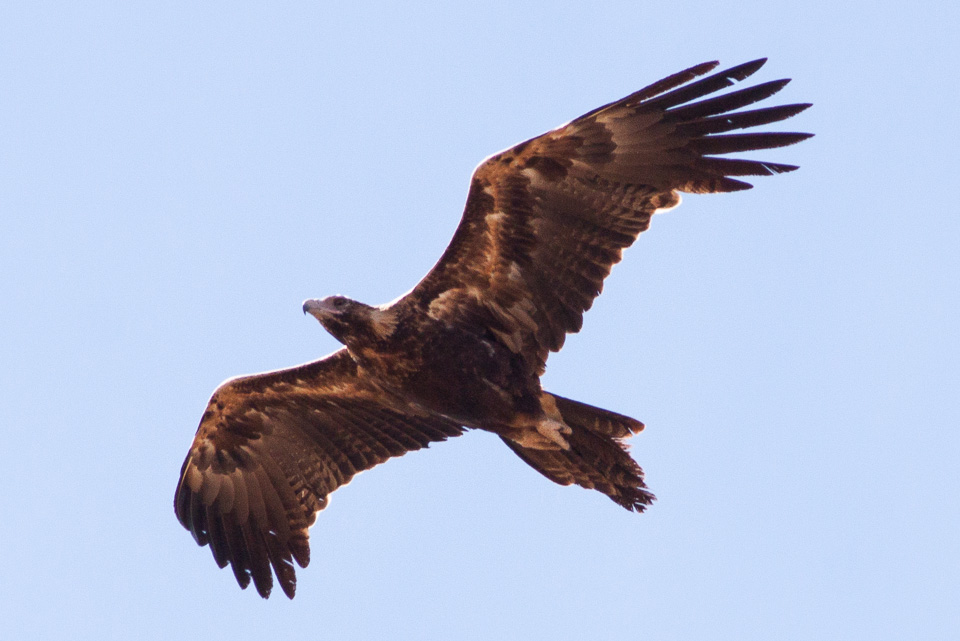
Bunjil, the wedge-tailed eagle

- Bunjil and Pallian creation story: Bunjil is the creator spirit of the Kulin people.
- Birrarung creation story: formation of the Birrarung River.

== History during colonisation ==
=== Initial contact and conflict with Europeans ===
The first documented contact between Europeans and the Bunurong was made in February 1802 when the British naval commander Lieutenant John Murray and his crew from the Lady Nelson came ashore in Port Phillip Bay for fresh water near present-day Sorrento. A wary exchange of spears and stone axes for shirts, mirrors and a steel axe, ended when the crew of Lady Nelson panicked, resulting in an exchange of spears and musket shots. Murray then ordered grapeshot and round shot to be fired from the carronades aboard the ship, mortally wounding several fleeing Bunurong people.

The following month, Captain Milius from the French ship Naturaliste, in the Baudin expedition, met with a group of Bunurong at Western Port in a much more peaceful contact. A botanist on the voyage, Jean-Baptiste Leschenault de La Tour, described the people as "having pleasant features and are painted...red or white stripes or crosses on their faces and other parts of their bodies. Several wore a thin piece of wood around six or seven inches long through the cartilage of their nose. One of them wore a white feather in his hair and a necklace made from small sections of bulrush which had been burnt at both ends. All were naked apart from one who appeared more serious than the others and wore over the upper part of his body a black fur".

In 1803, Governor King sent Lieutenant Charles Robbins in HMS Cumberland to further explore Port Phillip. This surveying party, which included Charles Grimes, found Bunurong habitations at Tootgarook, Carrum Carrum, and on the banks of the Yarra River.

=== Sullivan Bay convict colony ===
Later that same year, it was decided by the British colonial authorities to establish a convict colony at Port Phillip Bay. David Collins of the Royal Navy arrived aboard HMS Calcutta with over 400 convicts and marines in September 1803. Whilst landing at Sullivan Bay near present-day Sorrento, the colonists encountered a group of Bunurong whom they pursued, shot at and then burnt down their huts, killing one of them. Collins later attempted to placate the situation with the offering of blankets and biscuits.

Collins sent First Lieutenant James Hingston Tuckey to explore Port Phillip. Tuckey, after skirmishing with around 200 Aborigines at Corio Bay, advised Collins that there were better places around Port Phillip but, as these areas were "full of natives" that would "require four times the strength" of his current armed forces to displace, Collins decided to disband the colony and move it to Van Diemen's Land. During their seven months at Sullivan Bay, around 18 colonists died and seven convicts absconded. One of these run-aways, William Buckley, survived and lived a mostly traditional Aboriginal lifestyle with the Wathaurung until the British returned in 1835.

=== Abduction by sealers ===
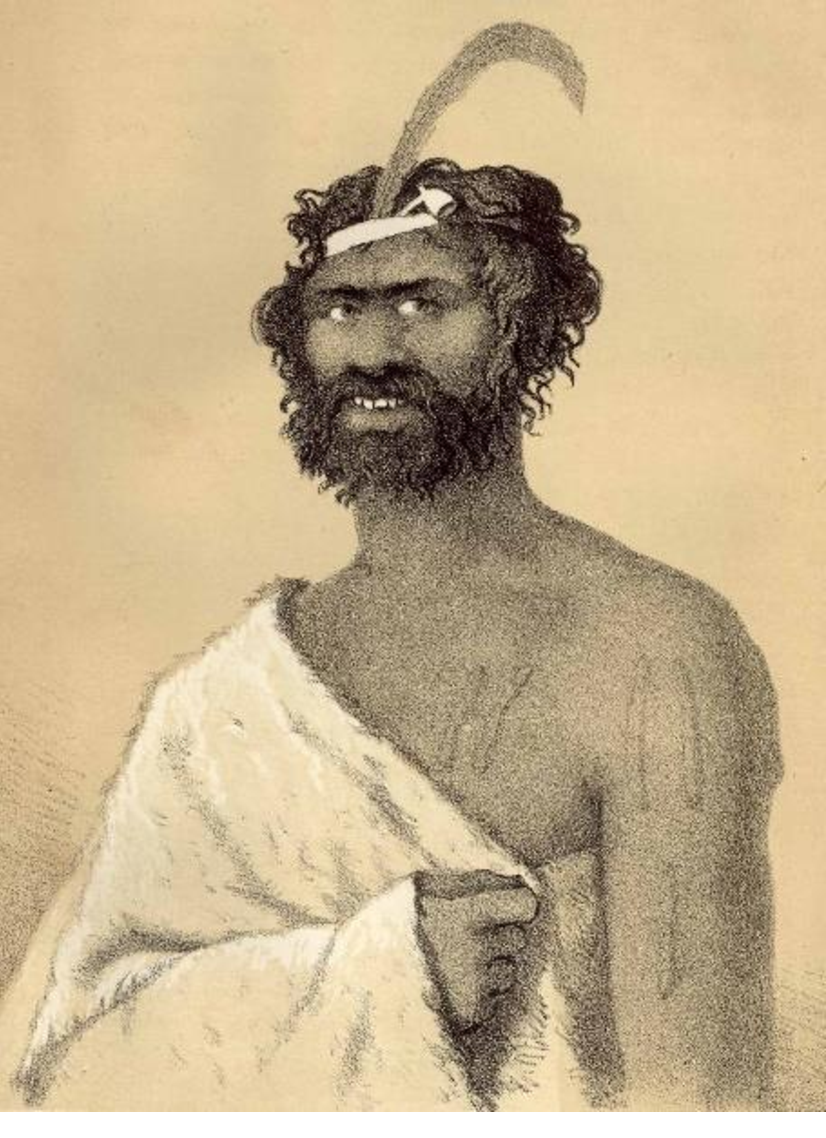
Yonki Yonka, a Bunurong man who was kidnapped by seal hunters as a boy

From around 1801, the Bunurong people, living primarily along the Port Phillip and Western Port coast, had their livelihoods affected by seal hunters. The sealers' abduction of Bunurong men and women to work as slaves and provide sexual gratification, caused massive upheaval to the social structure of Aboriginal groups, including the Bunurong, whose coastlands were visited by sealers.

By 1826, Phillip Island was a permanent base for sealers and a report by the French explorer, Jules Dumont d'Urville in 1830, attributed the absence of Bunurong on Phillip Island, to the violent methods of the sealers in abducting local people. Sealers such as Thomas Hamilton and Old Scott lived seasonally at Western Port for years with abducted Indigenous women.

In 1833, nine Woiwurrung and Bunurong women, and a boy, Yonki Yonka, were kidnapped near Arthur's Seat and taken across to the sealers' Bass Strait island bases. After seven years, Yonki Yonka escaped to Launceston and then worked as a crewman on a ship to Western Australia before finding his way to Adelaide and then returning to his homeland to the joy of his clan in 1841.

As late as 1836, several bloody raiding attacks by sealers on Bunurong clans at Western Port resulted in the abduction of at least four young women and a number of children.

Contact with sealers also exposed the coastal tribes to European diseases, and this exercised a heavy impact on the demographics, and the economic and social ties binding the Bunurong people.

=== Introduced diseases ===
James Fleming, one of the party of surveyor Charles Grimes in HMS Cumberland who explored the Maribyrnong River and the Yarra River as far as Dights Falls in February 1803, reported smallpox scars on several aboriginal people he met, suggesting that a smallpox epidemic might have swept through the tribes around Port Philip before 1803, reducing the population. Broome puts forward that two epidemics of smallpox decimated the population of the Kulin tribes by perhaps killing half each time in the 1790s and again around 1830. (Note: It is attested that in some Victorian tribes, such of those found in the Loddon area the advent of the smallpox was associated with s serpent, Mindye, whose maleficence could be conjured by sorcerers to harm people. An early colonist wrote: "Any plague is supposed to be brought on by the Mindye or some of its little ones. I have no doubt that, in generations gone by, there has been an awful plague of cholera or black fever, and that the wind at the time, or some other appearance from the north-west has given rise to this strange being." (Thomas 1898, pp. 84–85, 89–90)) This theory has been challenged, however, by modern historical diagnosticians, who argue that the observed symptoms in the early ethnographical literature are compatible with impetigo and ringworm.

After the permanent British colonisation of the Bunurong homelands from 1835, introduced diseases such as syphilis and other venereal diseases became common in Aboriginal camps that were frequented by colonists for sex. In 1847, an influenza outbreak ravaged the remnants of the Kulin tribes.

=== British colonisation ===
British authorities attempted colonise Bunurong land in 1826 by placing a small military and convict outpost named Settlement Point at Western Port. However, this was abandoned in 1828.

In 1835, a company of wealthy colonists called the Port Phillip Association, represented by John Batman, made a treaty with the Kulin people that appropriated much of the land around the Yarra River to the company. Other colonists soon arrived and by 1838, most of the Bunurong lands had been taken. The Bunurong people were forced off their land and into fringe camps, namely on the south bank of the Yarra and at Warrowen. These were places of misery, disease and hunger, where the inhabitants attempted to exist by living off the scraps of the adjacent British settlement at Melbourne.

==== Removal to reserves ====
In 1837, an Aboriginal reserve run by Reverend George Langhorne was created at what is now the Royal Botanic Gardens for the Bunurong and other Kulin people. A small school was established at which around 18 Aboriginal children attended. However, within a few months the police magistrate William Lonsdale accused some of the attending Indigenous men of stealing potatoes from a nearby farm, and he raided the reserve with a detachment of New South Wales Mounted Police, dispersing the residents with gun fire. As a result, the mission ceased to operate.

In 1839, a system of Aboriginal Protectors was established in Melbourne and William Thomas was assigned to manage the Bunurong people. The governing British authority in the region, Charles La Trobe, directed Thomas that the Bunurong should be removed well away from the vicinity of Melbourne, and Thomas subsequently chose Arthur's Seat on the Mornington Peninsula as a place to hold the Bunurong.

This soon proved inadequate and La Trobe designated a reserve called Nerre Nerre Warren that all the remaining Kulin people around Melbourne should be deposited at. However, most of these Aboriginal people continued to camp closer to Melbourne. In October 1840, La Trobe ordered a large military raid, later called the Lettsom raid, upon these illegal camps, capturing and imprisoning around 350 people which included Bunurong men, women and children. The Bunurong were later released and told they had to reside at Nerre Nerre Warren.

The Nerre Nerre Warren site lacked both food and a reliable water supply and the Aboriginal people refused to stay there. In 1842, a reserve was therefore negotiated and approved at the junction of Merri Creek with the Yarra River. In 1847, the Bunurong abandoned the Merri Creek reserve due to an outbreak of influenza.

==== Troopers for the Native Police ====
Faced with the option of a precarious life of famine and misery in either illegal Aboriginal camps or underfunded reserves, some Bunurong men chose to join the Native Police Corps in Victoria as troopers, which provided regular pay, rations, clothing and housing for both themselves and their families. The ability to possess guns and horses also gave them an empowering status otherwise unattainable for Aboriginal men in the European world.

The Native Police was a mounted paramilitary force consisting of Aboriginal troopers under the command of Captain Henry Dana that provided settlers in the more distant regions a cost-effective militia to counter Aboriginal resistance. According to La Trobe, the troopers would not only be the "equals in savage cunning" of the Indigenous insurgents but be "their superiors" by being armed with guns, swords and military training.

Of the first intake of 22 men in 1842, around ten were Bunurong, including notable people such as Yonki Yonka, Buckup, Benbow and Perpine. Over the ten year history of the Port Phillip Native Police, the troopers completed various tours of duty around what became the state of Victoria. The force were involved in several massacres of Aboriginal people, and some troopers were later deployed as police on the Victorian gold-fields.

By the end of 1852, Aboriginal resistance in Victoria had been quashed and La Trobe disbanded the force, with most of the troopers having already died from violence or disease.

==== Destruction of Bunurong society ====
The Bunurong had been reduced to 80–90 people by 1839, with only 4 of 19 children under four years old, from a probable pre-contact population of greater than 500 people. By 1852 it was estimated just 20 Bunurong people were still alive.

In 1852, the remaining Bunurong were allocated 340 hectares (840 acres) at Mordialloc Creek while the Woiwurrung gained 782 hectares along the Yarra at Warrandyte. The Aboriginal reserves were never staffed by whites and were not permanent camps, but acted as distribution depots where rations and blankets were distributed, with the intention being to keep the tribes away from the growing settlement of Melbourne. The Aboriginal Protection Board revoked these two reserves in 1862–1863, considering them now too close to Melbourne.

In March 1863, after three years of upheaval, the surviving Kulin leaders, among them Simon Wonga and William Barak, led forty Wurundjeri, Taungurung (Goulburn River) and Bunurong people over the Black Spur and squatted on a traditional camping site on Badger Creek near Healesville and requested ownership of the site. This became Coranderrk Station, named after the Woiwurrung word for the Victorian Christmas bush. Coranderrk was closed in 1924 and its occupants were moved to Lake Tyers in Gippsland.

==== Ransacking of grave sites ====
After the process of removing the Bunurong people from their land through death or displacement, their centuries old burial sites became vulnerable to pillaging from collectors. The cemeteries of the Yowenjerre clan from the Tarwin River region were extensively ransacked in the early 1900s by a local landholder named George Murray Black. He dug up and collected at least a dozen Aboriginal skeletons in the district.

Up until the 1950s, Black systematically pillaged thousands of Aboriginal grave sites across Victoria, donating hundreds of skeletons to the anatomy departments of the University of Melbourne and the Australian Institute of Anatomy in Canberra. He regarded his actions as a hobby and often dumped incomplete skeletal remains into creeks.

== Notable people ==
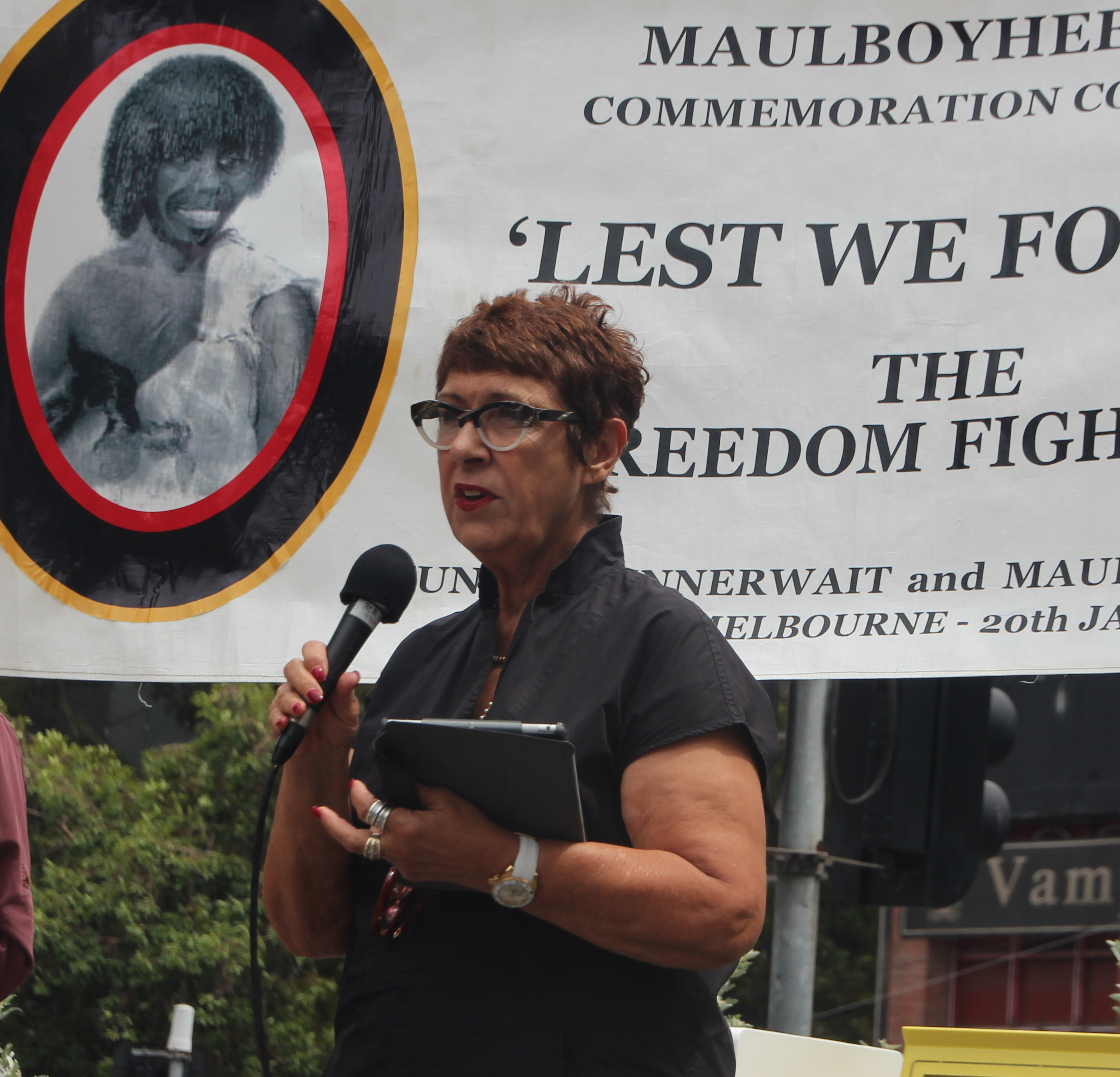
Bunurong elder N'Arweet Carolyn Briggs

One particularly notable person at the time of British colonisation in Victoria was Derrimut, a Bunurong elder, who informed early European settlers in October 1835 of an impending attack by clans from the Woiwurrung group. The colonists armed themselves, and the attack was averted. Benbow also acted to protect the colonists. Derrimut later became very disillusioned and died in the Benevolent Asylum at the age of about 54 years in 1864. A few colonists erected a tombstone to Derrimut in Melbourne General Cemetery in his honour, on the 26th August of that year.

=== List of notable people ===
- Jack Charles (1943– 2022), actor.
- Derrimut (c. 1810 – 28 May 1864), arweet – headman of the Bunurong
- Carolyn Briggs
- Louisa Briggs
- Maree Clarke (artist)

== Alternative names ==
- Boonerwrung
- Bunuron
- Boonwurrung, Bunwurrung, Boonwerung, Boonoorong and Bururong
- Bunwurru
- Putnaroo, Putmaroo
- Thurung (an eastern tribal exonym for the Bunjurong, meaning tiger snakes, a metaphor indicating the sneaky way they set up ambushes against the eastern tribes)
- Toturin (a Gunai term for 'black snake, used for several western Bunurong clans.

== See also ==
- Australian Aboriginal enumeration
- Possum-skin cloak

== Sources ==
- "About Us". Boon Wurrung Foundation. 6 August 2013.
- Barwick, Diane E. (1984). McBryde, Isabel (ed.). "Mapping the past: an atlas of Victorian clans 1835–1904". Aboriginal History. 8 (2): 100–131. JSTOR 24045800.
- Barwick, Laura (2005). "Briggs, Louisa (1836–1925)". Australian Dictionary of Biography. Melbourne University Press.
- Blainey, Geoffrey (2013). A History of Victoria (2nd ed.). Cambridge University Press. ISBN 978-1-107-29277-2.
- Boyce, James (2008). Van Diemen's Land. Black Inc Books. ISBN 9781760644819.
- Boyce, James (2011). 1835: The founding of Melbourne and the conquest of Australia. Black Inc Books. ISBN 9781760644802.
- Bride, Thomas (1898). Letters from Victorian Pioneers. Melbourne: Government Printer.
- Broome, Richard (2005). Aboriginal Victorians: A History Since 1800. Allen & Unwin. ISBN 978-1-74114-569-4.
- Cahir, Fred (David); Clark, Ian (2013). "The Historic Importance of the Dingo in Aboriginal Society in Victoria (Australia): A Reconsideration of the Archival Record,". Anthrozoös. 26 (2): 185–198.
- Canning, Shaun; Thiele, Frances (February 2010). Indigenous Cultural Heritage and History within the Metropolitan Melbourne Investigation Area: A report to the Victorian Environmental Assessment Council (PDF). Australian Cultural Heritage Management. pp. 1–48.
- Cannon, Michael (1993). Black Land, White Land. Minerva. ISBN 1863303154.
- Chadwick, Vince (28 January 2013). "Action plan to support Victoria's indigenous barristers". The Age.
- Clark, Ian; Briggs, Carolyn (2011). The Yalukit-Willam: The First People of Hobsons Bay (PDF). Hobsons Bay City Council.
- Clark, Ian D (1990). Aboriginal languages and clans: an historical atlas of western and central Victoria, 1800–1900. Dept. of Geography and Environmental Science, Monash University. ISBN 978-0-909685-41-6.
- Clark, Ian D. (1995). Scars in the Landscape: a register of massacre sites in western Victoria, 1803–1859 (PDF). AIATSIS. pp. 135–139. ISBN 0-85575-281-5.
- Clark, Ian D. (1 December 2005). ""You have all this place, no good have children ..." Derrimut: traitor, saviour, or a man of his people?". Journal of the Royal Australian Historical Society.
- Clark, Ian D. (2015). A Peep at the Blacks': A History of Tourism at Coranderrk Aboriginal Station, 1863–1924. Walter de Gruyter. ISBN 978-3-110-46824-3.
- Clark, Ian D.; Heydon, Toby (2004). A Bend in the Yarra: A History of the Merri Creek Protectorate Station and Merri Creek Aboriginal School 1841–1851. Aboriginal Studies Press. ISBN 978-0-855-75469-3.
- Compton, Steve. "The Bunurong People". Inverloch History.
- "Conversations with Richard Fidler". ABC Radio. 1 February 2016.
- "The Coranderrk Aboriginal Station". The Argus. No. 9, 428. Melbourne. 1 September 1876. p. 7 – via National Library of Australia.
- Dixon, Robert M. W. (2002). Australian Languages: Their Nature and Development. Vol. 1. Cambridge University Press. ISBN 978-0-521-47378-1.
- Dunstan, Joseph (26 June 2021). "Melbourne's birth destroyed Bunurong and Wurundjeri boundaries. 185 years on, they've been redrawn". ABC News.
- Eddie, Rachel (1 July 2021). "Traditional owners formalised in new boundaries covering central Melbourne". The Age.
- Fels, Marie (1986). Good Men and True. 1986 PhD Thesis. Archived from the original on 25 August 2017.
- Fels, Marie Hansen (2011). 'I Succeeded Once': The Aboriginal Protectorate on the Mornington Peninsula,1839–1840 (PDF). ANU Press. ISBN 978-1-921-86212-0.
- Fleming, James (2002). Currey, John (ed.). A journal of Grimes' survey : the Cumberland in Port Phillip January-February 1803 (PDF). Malvern, Victoria: Banks Society Publications. p. 43. ISBN 978-0-949586-10-0. Archived from the original (PDF) on 28 March 2020.
- Fletcher, Brian (1984). Ralph Darling, a governor maligned. Oxford University Press. ISBN 0195545648.
- Gaughwin, Denise; Sullivan, Hilary (1984). McBryde, Isabel (ed.). "Aboriginal boundaries and movement in Western Port, Victoria" (PDF). Aboriginal History. 8 (1): 80–98. ISSN 0314-8769.
- Gunson, Niel (1968). The Good Country: Cranbourne Shire. F. W. Cheshire.
- Howitt, Alfred William (2010) [First published 1904]. The Native Tribes of South-East Australia. Cambridge University Press. ISBN 978-1-108-00632-3.
- Koungoulos, Loukas George; Balme, Jane; O’Connor, Sue (20 October 2023). "Dingoes, companions in life and death: The significance of archaeological canid burial practices in Australia" (PDF). PLOS One. 18 (10): 1–36.
- Leschenault, Jean-Baptiste (1802). Extract of the Journal de Théodore Leschenault (PDF).
- McGaw, Janet; Pieris, Anoma (2014). Assembling the Centre: Architecture for Indigenous Cultures: Australia and Beyond. Routledge. ISBN 978-1-317-59894-7.
- Munro, Kate (14 August 2014). "Actor Jack Charles: the tumultuous life of a stolen child". The Guardian.
- Pascoe, Bruce (2018). Dark Emu: Aboriginal Australia and the birth of agriculture (New ed.). Broome, Western Australia: Magabala Books. ISBN 978-1-921248-01-6. OCLC 1038067363.
- Plomley, NJB (2008). Friendly Mission: The Tasmanian journals and papers of George Augustus Robinson. Quintus. ISBN 9780977557226.
- Presland, Gary (1994) [First published 1985]. Aboriginal Melbourne. The lost land of the Kulin people. McPhee Gribble. ISBN 978-0-869-14346-9.
- Presland, Gary (1997). The First Residents of Melbourne's Western Region. Harriland Press. ISBN 978-064633150-8.
- Pybus, Cassandra (2024). A Very Secret Trade. Allen & Unwin. ISBN 9781761066344.
- Shaw, A. G. L. (2003). A History of the Port Phillip District: Victoria Before Separation. Melbourne University Press. ISBN 978-0-522-85064-2.
- Shillinglaw, John Joseph (1879). Historical records of Port Phillip: the first annals of the colony of Victoria (PDF). Melbourne: J. Ferres. pp. 15–30 – via Internet Archive.
- "Skeleton Unearthed In Sand Dune". The Canberra Times. Vol. 31, no. 9, 388. Australian Capital Territory, Australia. 27 January 1958. p. 3 – via National Library of Australia.
- Smyth, Robert Brough (1878). The Aborigines of Victoria: with notes relating to the habits of the natives of other parts of Australia and Tasmania (PDF). Vol. 1. Melbourne: J. Ferres, gov't printer.
- Thomas, William (1898). "Letter 14. Account of the Aborigines" (PDF). In Bride, Thomas Francis (ed.). Letters from Victorian Pioneers. Melbourne: Robert S Brain Government Printer. pp. 84–100 – via Internet Archive.
- Tindale, Norman Barnett (1974). "Bunurong (Vic)". Aboriginal Tribes of Australia: Their Terrain, Environmental Controls, Distribution, Limits, and Proper Names. Australian National University Press. ISBN 978-0-708-10741-6.
