= Louisa Briggs =

Australian Aboriginal leader, dormitory matron, and nurse (1836–1925)

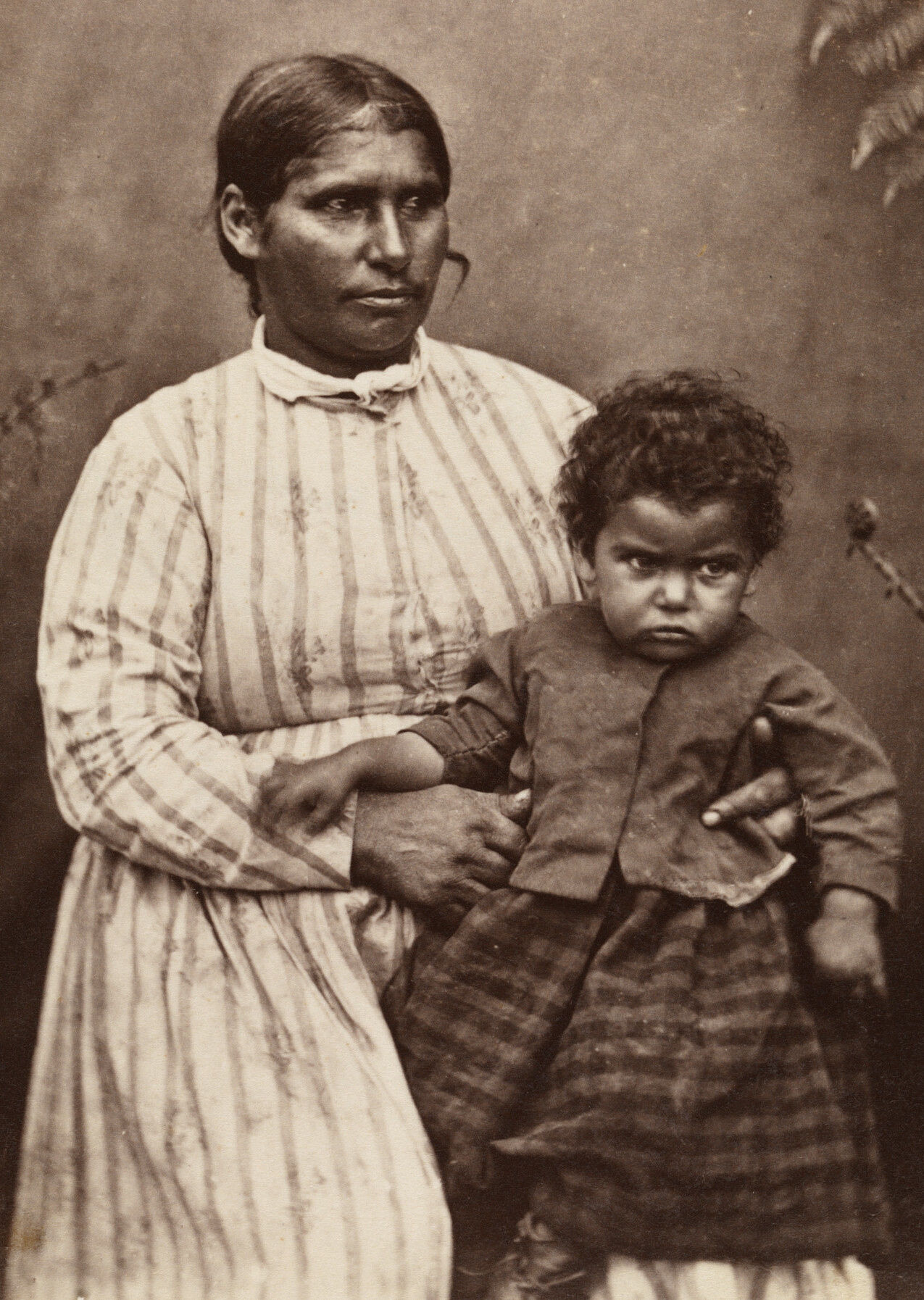
- Briggs and grandson William in 1877
- Born: Louisa Esmai Strugnell; 14 November 1818 or 1836; Port Phillip Bay, New Holland (Australia) or Preservation Island, Tasmania, Australia
- Died: 6 or 8 September 1925; Cumeroogunga, New South Wales, Australia
- Other name: Louisa Strugnell
- Occupations: Prospector, farm worker, midwife, nurse, dormitory matron, human rights activist
- Years active: 1853–1903
- Children: 9
- Relatives: Ellen Atkinson (granddaughter); Carolyn Briggs (great-granddaughter)

Louisa Briggs (née Strugnell; 14 November 1836 – 6 September 1925) was an Aboriginal Australian rights activist, dormitory matron, midwife and nurse. She is officially recognised by the Victorian Government and the Victorian Aboriginal Heritage Council as one of five apical ancestors from whom Boonwurrung descent is established.

Variations exist in the origin accounts of Louisa. Her own account was that she was the daughter of a woman from the area around Port Phillip Bay named Mary and an English sealer, John Strugnell. In an interview, she said that her mother was biracial and her grandmother Marjorie (Margery) was a full-blooded Indigenous woman from the area of Melbourne. Louisa may have been born in Victoria, but other accounts indicate it was likely that she was born on Preservation Island in Tasmania. She and her husband John Briggs had nine children. They took part in the Australian gold rushes of the 1850s and between prospecting, lived on the privately owned Eurambeen Station, where they did farm labour and worked as shepherds. When the gold boom economy slowed, they were unable to find work and in 1871, moved to Coranderrk Aboriginal Station, a reserve which the government had created for the resettlement of the Boonwurrung and Woiwurrung people.

At Coranderrk, Louisa worked as a nurse and midwife. She replaced a European staff member as a paid dormitory matron in 1876. Louisa participated in an inquiry that year over mismanagement of the station. After she and her minor children were evicted from Coranderrk in 1878, they moved to the Ebenezer Aboriginal Station, where she was hired as a nurse and laundress. She protested the treatment of Aboriginal people on the government reserves, repeatedly sending letters about the lack of rations and low wages. Her activism resulted in officials' decisions to keep her family separated between the two stations until 1882, but also eventually caused rations and wages at both reserves to be equalised. When she and her children were allowed to return to Coranderrk, Louisa was reinstated as dormitory matron. Because administrators wanted to sell the land for the stations, they began to enforce a policy of assimilation for biracial people. Louisa's son Jack relocated to the Maloga Mission and she joined him there 1885. When Jack's wife died and Louisa took over the care of his children, she sought to return to Coranderrk but her request was denied.

In 1889, Louisa and the family moved to the Cummeragunja Reserve, but she continued petitioning to return to Coranderrk without success. The policy of excluding biracial people from the government stations was extended to Cummeragunja in 1895, and the family was forced to remove to a makeshift camp near Barmah. Although a request for rations was denied to her in 1903, she was at some point allowed to return to Cummeragunja, where she was residing in 1923. She died and was buried there in 1925. She was honoured with a bronze plaque in the Pioneer Women's Memorial Garden in Melbourne and at Site 31 on the Bayside Coastal Indigenous Trail in Victoria. Two theatrical productions have included interpretations of her life.

== Conflicting origin accounts ==
=== Background ===
Anthropological and historical attention to Aboriginal biographies did not emerge until the last-half of the twentieth century, when the anthropologist Diane Barwick began exploring their lives. Barwick acknowledged in 1985, that Australian interest in Aboriginal history was still lacking, despite pioneering work done by William Edward Hanley Stanner in the 1960s. Government policy, rather than the choice of Aboriginal people to define themselves, dictated identity and status. As a result, allegiances were often ignored and an official policy of forced assimilation was followed. Time lapses in publishing reports, scarcity of official records, misinterpretation of oral reports, lack of literacy of Aboriginal people and knowledge of Aboriginal languages, and biases of interviewers, all distorted the surviving records, making it difficult to collect and interpret the sourcing. The custom of omitting names of recently deceased persons in some Indigenous cultures and the renaming of Aboriginals with European names, also compounds identification of subjects. All of these issues led to variations in the history of Louisa Strugnell Briggs.

=== Variants ===
Laura Barwick, who wrote the entry for the Australian Dictionary of Biography, stated that Louisa Strugnell was born on 14 November 1836 at Preservation Island, Tasmania, Australia, to Mary "Polly" (née Munro) and John Strugnell. In this version of events, John was a sealer who had been transported to Australia from London as a convict in 1818. Mary was the daughter of a Woiwurrung woman, Doog-by-er-um-bor-oke (known as Margery Munro), who had been kidnapped from Port Phillip, Victoria, and married the sealer James Munro. Historian, Marie Hansen Fels disputed that Doog-by-er-um-bor-oke was Margery Munro because the colonial official George Augustus Robinson's 1837 report to the Colonial Secretary indicated that after the 1833 abduction, Doog-by-er-um-bor-oke was living in Melbourne and still mourning her two kidnapped daughters. The woman living with John Munro on Preservation Island did have two daughters, but according to Fels, these could not have been Doog-by-er-um-bor-oke's children because she was separated from her daughters. The account is also disputed by Crawford Pasco's record of a meeting with Louisa at Coranderrk Station in which she told him that she and her mother had been abducted by Munro from Point Nepean and transported in his boat to Preservation Island, where she grew up. Diane Barwick reported that her death certificate showed that Louisa was born in Launceston, Tasmania, noting that information given by relatives in distress may be unreliable.

Other sources state that Louisa Esmai Strugnell was born in Point Nepean in Victoria to Truganini, an Indigenous woman from the Bruny Island people in Tasmania, and John Strugnell. As bounties were offered for capturing Aboriginal people, Truganini hid Louisa with Kulin nation people, (Note: The Kulin nation was traditionally described as containing numerous tribes and clans which were interconnected through five related languages, Bunurong, Kurung, Taungurung, Wathaurung, and Wurundjeri. According to Diane Barwick, modern scholars recognise Kulin language groups as Bunurong (Boonwurrung), Ngurai-illam-wurrung, Taungurong (Thagunworung or Thagungwurrung), Woiworung (Woiwurrung) as Eastern Kulin and Jajowrong (Dhadhawurrung) and Wathaurung speakers as Western Kulin. The Australian Institute of Aboriginal and Torres Strait Islander Studies, states that Ngurai-illam-wurrung may have been a separate language, or a variant name of the Thagungwurrung language.) before her abduction and exile. The child grew up with the Kulin people and married John Briggs in Victoria, Australia. Newspapers at the time of Louisa's death widely reported she was born around 1818 in Tasmania to "Queen Truganini" and "King John" and moved to Victoria after her marriage, but just two years before they had reported she was born in 1823. Diane Barwick refuted ties to Truganini based upon reports that Truganini was childless according to 1974 research by historians who were involved in a proposed legal action of the Victorian Aboriginal Legal Service. She also stated that because of widespread belief that the Tasmanian Aborigines were extinct and Truganini was one of the few named Tasmanians widely known, links to her were common in the media.

In another version of Louisa's origin, Carolyn Briggs, a Boon Wurrung elder and founder of the cultural preservation association, the Boon Wurrung Foundation, tells that her grandfather William Briggs was the son of Louisa, who was born in Melbourne, the traditional home of the Boon Wurrung people. Their family history holds that Louisa, her mother, and her mother's sister and mother were all kidnapped from Port Phillip Bay and transported by sealers to Furneaux Islands in the Bass Strait. While living in Tasmania, Louisa met John Briggs, whom she married before returning in 1858 to her people. John was a Native Tasmanian and the son of chief Manalagenna. Diane Barwick concluded that Louisa was probably the three-week-old child living with John Strugnell in 1837 on Preservation Island and whose death certificate showed she was born in Launceston. Barwick also stated that Louisa and John were participating in gold digs by 1853 or 1854. The Indigenous researchers Maggie Walter and Louise Daniels state that John Briggs was the grandson of Mannalargenna.

=== Historical analysis ===
Fels analyzed the various versions of Louisa's history and identified discrepancies between published reports and the previous scholarly examinations. (Note: Fels identifies those efforts as a 1985 report by Diane Barwick, which established the Boonwurrung as the original owners of the Mornington Peninsula; an unpublished manuscript written by historian Jacqueline D'Arcy entitled The Problem with Louisa Briggs, which concluded that Briggs was Tasmanian; a 2002 analysis prepared by historian Ian D. Clark for the Department of Justice for a Native title claim; Native Title Tribunal genealogical reports from 2005 and 2006 created by unknown authors; and a report prepared by historian Sue Wesson for the Victorian Aboriginal Heritage Council. Fels states that none of these reports are open to the general public and as a result, she reviewed primary records.) For example, one version of Briggs's life said she returned to Melbourne when she was eighteen, but that there were only three houses there. Europeans arrived in 1835 and by 1836, thirteen homes had been built, so her arrival would have had to occur before that time and would be at odds with her reported birth year of 1836. (Note: If she was born in 1818 as reported by newspapers at the time of her death, she would have been eighteen years old in 1836.) Fels read notes by Diane Barwick of an interview with Louisa from 1924, which showed Louisa's testimony was that she returned to Melbourne after having married, when the city was smaller than the Cummeragunja Reserve, but had more than three houses – not only three houses, and not necessitating her return in 1836.

Looking at abductions, Fels concluded that between March and May 1833, eight women and one boy named Yankee Yankee (or Yaunki Younker) were abducted from Arthurs Seat and taken to the islands in the Bass Strait. Among the women were wives of headmen Betbenjee, Big Benbow, Budgery Tom, and Derrimut, another woman who escaped, and at least two or three young girls. Yankee Yankee identified in 1841 the woman who escaped at Wilsons Promontory as Toutkuningrook. An investigation was launched in 1836 by the authorities, who made a plan to identify and rescue the women. An Aboriginal woman from Tasmania known as Matilda (also Maria, or May-te-pue-min-ner), advised Robinson, that she had helped George Meredith Jr., son of George Meredith the wealthy settler, and sealers aboard his schooner Defiance lure women who were hunting kangaroos, who were then kidnapped and taken to the Furneaux Islands.

Bass Strait and Port Phillip Bay detailing the places where Briggs's family were reported to have lived

Robinson's rescue mission stopped on 9 January 1837, on Preservation Island where he identified a Native woman from Port Phillip who was living with James Monro. She was the mother of an infant born on the island and two daughters, aged fourteen (born around 1823) and sixteen (born around 1821), who had been born in Port Phillip. The older daughter had two biracial children by John Strugnell. She and Strugnell were living on Gun Carriage Island with their children, a two-year-old and three-week-old baby. A fifth woman from Port Phillip, who arrived with Richard Maynard from Clarke's Island, was pregnant with Maynard's child. Robinson failed to recover any of the women either because they were ill or did not want to return. He recorded names for two women involved in the abductions – Doog-by-er-um-bor-oke and Nan-der-gor-ok – and two girls who were kidnapped – Nay-nar-gor-rote and Bo-ro-dang-er-gor-roke. According to Fels, Diane Barwick concluded that Doog-by-er-um-bor-oke was Margery Munro and that Nan-der-gor-ok, wife of the headman Derrimut, was Elizabeth Maynard, but did not indicate how she connected the names. (Note: Barwick's article, This Most Resolute Lady: A Biographical Puzzle provides the general information that she used genealogical records prepared by Louisa's family in "1871, 1912, 1939, 1949, and 1974", as well as two interviews with Louisa from 1897 and 1924, interviews with Louisa's daughters who were living in 1938, and other family interviews which were made in the 1950s and 1960s.) Both Clark and D'Arcy questioned the identification because of the lack of evidence on how the authentication was made. Fels postulated that Doog-by-er-um-bor-oke's daughters might be Maynard's wife and another woman reported to be living with Abysinnia Jack, since they were in Tasmania and Doog-by-er-um-bor-oke was in Melbourne when she spoke to Robinson about her missing daughters.

In examining a letter dated 1856 from William Wilson to the Lord Bishop of Tasmania, Ian D. Clark reported that Maria Munro and an aged woman named Gudague had been removed by Mr. Howie to Robbins Island. Drawing on Wilson, Clark wrote that Gudague had been taken from Port Phillip to Tasmania by Munro in 1826. She had two daughters, Maria born in Tasmania, near the Ringarooma River and Pol, who was born on King Island, Tasmania, and had two daughters by a white man. Her son, Robert Munro was also born in Tasmania. (Note: Clark analyzed another report created by Robinson in 1837, in which women's names were recorded. In this report a woman named Toolom was living with Isaac, but no information has been located to make further identification. Other women listed were Nee-nut-nomy; Ninjit, living with Jack Williams; and Won-gor-rug. Another report evaluated by Clark, written by Robinson in 1847, supplied more names of women from the mainland living in Tasmania. These were Kar-ding-gor-oke, a woman related to Budgery Tom, who was living with Morgan; Meen-dut-goroke; and Nan-nert-goroke. Fels stated that some information in Clark's report was redacted making further analysis difficult, but said that Clark believed that "at least 20 women, girls, and boys were abducted from the coasts around Port Phillip and Western Port in the 1820s and 1830s". She also stated that D'Arcy placed the number of kidnap victims at around fifty. Fels examined a separate abduction reported in 1839 by George D. Smythe, a surveyor. In Smythe's report, three women and a boy were abducted from Port Phillip by the captain of the cutter George, and taken to Western Australia. The women abducted from Western Port and taken to King George Sound were Captain Williams's wife Mary, living in Water__; Eliza Nowen, living on Balls Island (possibly Bald Island per Fels); and Julian Morgan.) Norman Tindale wrote in 1953 that Sam Bligh's wife, whose name was unknown, but who Diane Barwick identified as Polly Munro, was a full-blooded Australian and bore two children, Emma and Eliza Bligh on Robbins Island. Barwick also reported that an 1863 report made by Archdeacon Thomas Reibey was the first statement to name Munro's (shown in the record as Monroe) companion as "Margery" and he stated that she was from Western Port. Reibey wrote that the year before she had been on Chappell Island but was then living on Little Dog Island with her son Robert and daughter Polly Bligh. Bligh was around forty years old and had been abandoned by her husband almost two decades before. He said that Polly had a seventeen-year-old daughter and a fourteen-year old daughter baptised as Emma.

Diane Barwick relied on oral histories and sparse official records to construct the family of James Munro. He was transported from the Middlesex Gaol in 1799 and released in 1806. He then worked as a boatman until 1819 when he became a sealer. In 1825 he became a constable and retired from sealing in 1830, although he retained his status as spokesman for the men living in the Bass Strait. During his time as a sealer, he abducted, bartered for, and purchased women, and reputedly treated them and their children "relatively benevolent[ly]". Barwick said that in Robinson's report of 1836, there was information that Munro had purchased one of the women abducted by Meredith, and that Robinson said in an 1837 report that Munro paid £7 for her. Munro died at the end of 1844 or beginning of 1845 and his obituary advised he had three children with an Aboriginal woman and his executor was to be Long Tom of Clarke Island.

After examining the 1837 Robinson report and the 1863 Reibey report, Diane Barwick concluded that the daughter born in 1821 was likely Mary "Polly", based on Louisa's statement of her mother's name, Mary listed as a daughter on Margery's death certificate, and a statement from Morgan Mansell that his mother Eliza Bligh was the half-sister of Harry Strugnell. With that analysis, she deduced that Harry was the two-year-old- and Louisa the three-week-old child living with John Strugnell in 1837. From genealogies published by L. W. G. Büchner in 1913, by L. W. G. Malcolm in 1920, and A. L. Meston in 1947, Barwick gleaned the information that Polly was born in Western Port to a white man and that after her relationship to Strugnell ended she had two children, Eliza (c. 1846–1916) and Emma (c. 1849–1926) with Sam Bligh (or Blythe). Of the daughter born around 1823 in Robinson's report, Barwick surmised from her analysis of N. J. B. Plomley's Friendly Mission: The Tasmanian Journals and Papers of George Augustus Robinson, 1829–1834 (1966), that she was Ann Munro, who was a full-blooded Aboriginal woman and the first wife of John Briggs. According to Barwick, John Briggs grew up in the Munro household after his father George Briggs sold his mother to John Thomas, known as Long Tom, for one guinea around 1830, and she was taken to Mauritius. George and his wife had three children, which besides John Briggs included Eliza and Mary Briggs, who were residing in Launceston in 1827 and 1831.

== Louisa's account ==
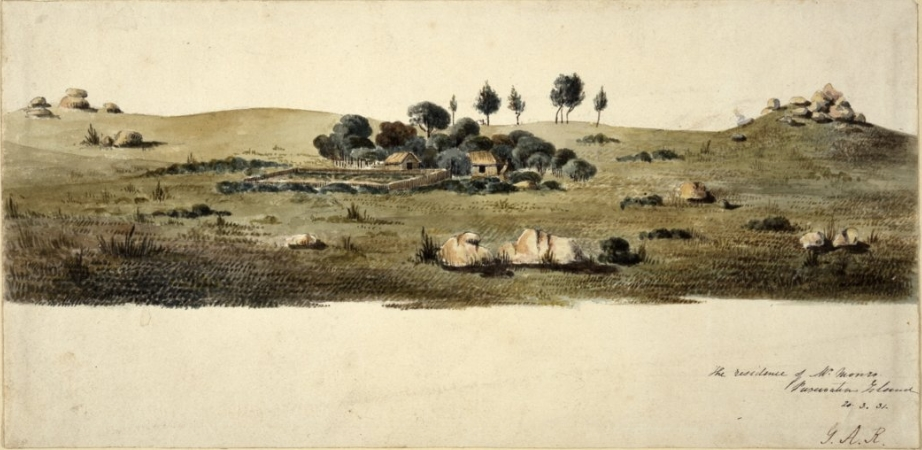
James Munro's homestead on Preservation Island, 1831

By her own account to Pasco, Louisa Strugnell was from the area around Port Phillip Bay and was taken with her mother to Preservation Island, when she was a child. (Note: Tindale accepted John Briggs' wife as a Victorian who was kidnapped and taken to Tasmania around 1837, but speculated that she had a sister, who might have been Jane Foster, who later married Andrew Armstrong.) Louisa also told the geographers Lesley Hall and Dorothy Taylor in a 1924 interview that her birthday was 14 November, but she did not know the year, and repeated the information that she was taken with her mother as a child to Tasmania in a small boat. In an earlier report, when she arrived at the Maloga Mission in 1885, she was recorded as having told a registrar she had been born in 1836. John Briggs, her husband, described Louisa as an Australian woman, whose mother and aunt had been abducted and taken to Tasmania. around 1837, at the time when William Buckley moved to Hobart. (Note: Buckley left Port Phillip at the end of 1837 and arrived in Hobart in early 1838.) In the 1924 interview, Louisa revealed that her mother was named Mary; her grandmother, a full-blooded Indigenous woman from Melbourne, was named Marjorie; and her father was John Strugnell. Strugnell was transported in 1818 and freed in 1825. He was transported to the Macquarie Harbour Penal Station for theft in 1826 and released in September 1833. In January 1837, Robinson reported Strugnell as living with his companion and two children on Preservation Island, but Strugnell was ordered out of the strait in September. Diane Barwick stated that this exile, from which the family returned by 1842, was likely the one remembered by Louisa and recounted by John Briggs.

Louisa was described in contemporary accounts as a biracial woman, who was tall, had blue eyes and dark, but not kinky hair. Instead her hair was straight or wavy but marked with a prominent white streak. She adopted Western ways and was raised as a Christian. In later life, she smoked heavily but did not consume alcohol. She was an avid reader of both fine literature and comics, and known for her sharp intelligence and strength of character, although she could not write. Louisa married John Briggs, who said they married in 1844. The marriage according to Laura Barwick took place in 1853, but Walter and Daniels, reported it as having occurred in 1844. Diane Barwick stated that a search of Tasmanian marriage records did not locate a marriage for John Briggs to either Louisa or Ann Munro, and that an obituary for Louisa indicated she might have married in Victoria before setting out to hunt for gold with John Briggs. Some researchers have determined that the relationships with John Briggs and his wives was polygamous. Diane Barwick also noted that George Briggs, John's son by Ann (1824–1884), a full-blooded Woiwurrung woman of the Yarra tribe, was born around 1843, which might indicate John had mixed up the dates of his marriages. John Briggs was born in 1820 and was the son of Woretemoeteryenner, a Trawlwoolway woman from the area around Cape Portland, Tasmania. His father, George Briggs was a British sealer, who had come to Port Jackson, New South Wales, as a teenager. Although some reports indicate George abducted Woretemoeteryenner, the fact that he had an amiable relationship for many years with her father, Mannalargenna the head man of the North East nation, points to an arranged partnership.

== Career ==
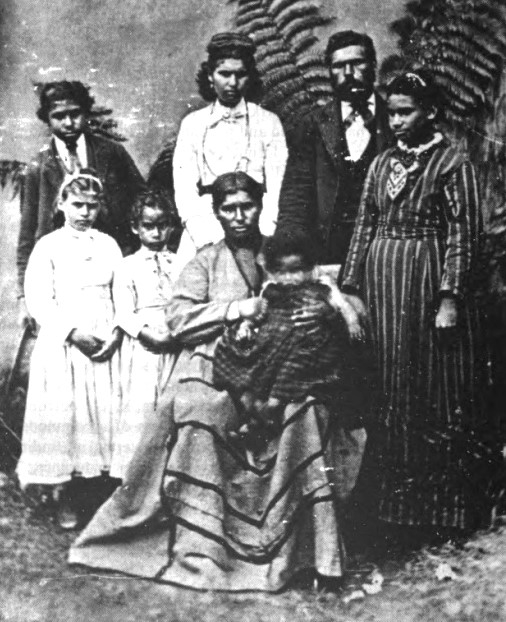
rear: William, Sarah, and Jack Briggs, and Lizzie Briggs Charles; front: Caroline, Ellen, and Louisa Briggs, holding her grandson William Charles

When she was seventeen, Louisa joined others as a participant in the Australian gold rushes around Victoria. She and John, along with his son George Briggs, prospected at Fiery Creek and then were at Mount Cole, when their first child John Jr. "Jack" was born. Over the next decade, they had eight more children: Henry (1855–1874), Sarah (1856–1892), Eliza (1857–1936), William (1861–1945), Margaret (1863-before 1925), Mary "Polly" (1866–1939), Caroline (1868–1947), and Ellen "Ann" (1871-1877/8). From 1856, the family lived on the Eurambeen Station, a private property owned by George Beggs. John and his wives Ann and Louisa are listed in the Eurambeen Wages Book, as shepherds and shearers, as well as farm hands, between stints as prospectors. They were employed in Violet Town, until the late 1860s, when the booming economy slowed and they were no longer able to find work. John and Louisa arrived in 1871 at the Coranderrk Aboriginal Station near Healesville in desperate need. This reserve was established in 1863 by the government for the resettlement of the Boonwurrung and Woiwurrung people. John and George Briggs would not have been eligible to settle on the reserve because their ancestry was Tasmanian. The fact that the Aboriginal Protection Board, which oversaw distribution of an annual appropriation for Aboriginal Victorians, declared the family eligible to reside in Coranderrk, persuaded Diane Barwick that the board members acknowledged Louisa's ancestors were from Melbourne.

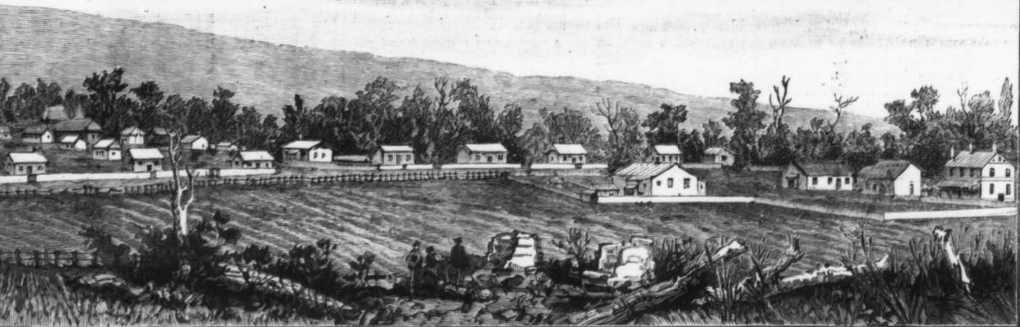
1889 sketch of the Coranderrk Aboriginal Station, in Victoria, Australia

In 1872, some of the family were expelled from the reserve over a labour dispute. The station manager, John Green had applied to the board for John Briggs to be hired for ten shillings per week as a ploughman. The board rejected paying any workers cash wages, which led all the reserve workers to protest and the manager to threaten them with a ration stoppage. As a result, John and his son Jack took work off the reserve, without permission, which led the board to pressure them to return to care for their family. When he did not, he was threatened with expulsion and wrote directly to the responsible Minister about the problem. That angered the station authorities which implemented the threat to expel John Briggs, but said as long as the children entered school, the family could remain. Laura Barwick said the family did not return to the reserve until 1874, and Diane Barwick stated their whereabouts until Henry drowned in June 1874 were unknown. Louisa's 1876 testimony was that she had lived on the reserve for five years and had served the station as a nurse and midwife since her arrival there.

The reserve was no longer exclusively for Kulin nation people by 1874, but was used as a resettlement asylum for biracial children from throughout Australia. There were more orphans on the reserve than Kulin inhabitants and the board had begun to sell off the fields the inhabitants had previously worked to produce cash crops. The situation led to open hostilities between the Kulin people and the management. Because Louisa could read and her children could write, she became a spokesperson for their grievances and her children wrote numerous protest letters for her against selling the land and relocating the residents. In an attempt to quash the unrest, in 1875 the board finally agreed to pay wages to the reserve residents and John Briggs was awarded a salary of six shillings per week. In 1876, Louisa was hired as a dormitory matron and served as a nurse. According to Diane Barwick, Louisa was "the first Aboriginal to replace a European as salaried staff member". The Argus reported she was paid ten shillings per week for her services, which included serving as laundress, cook, child carer, nurse, and general administrator.

An inquiry was held in August 1876 over alleged mismanagement at the reserve, but according to Diane Barwick it was also motivated by settlers living around the reserve who wanted to take the land. By alleging that the managers allowed the residents to become drunk and disorderly they hoped the residents would be removed to an area around the Murray River. The government rejected the board's request for more control of the residents, but problems continued. A Royal Commission was appointed in 1877 to investigate and develop a plan for the future of the reserve. John Briggs died in 1878, and that year, his eldest son George arrived at Coranderrk to see his mother. Ann Briggs had arrived at the station sometime after the August 1876 census of the inhabitants but prior to June 1878. Diane Barwick stated that it was likely she came in September 1877, when John Briggs requested funds for a trip to Tasmania from the manager. In the spring of 1878 a new manager was appointed for the reserve. He was routinely disliked and Louisa and other residents sent protest letters to the board. In response, the manager reported several disturbances caused by the Briggs family and forced Louisa off of the station.

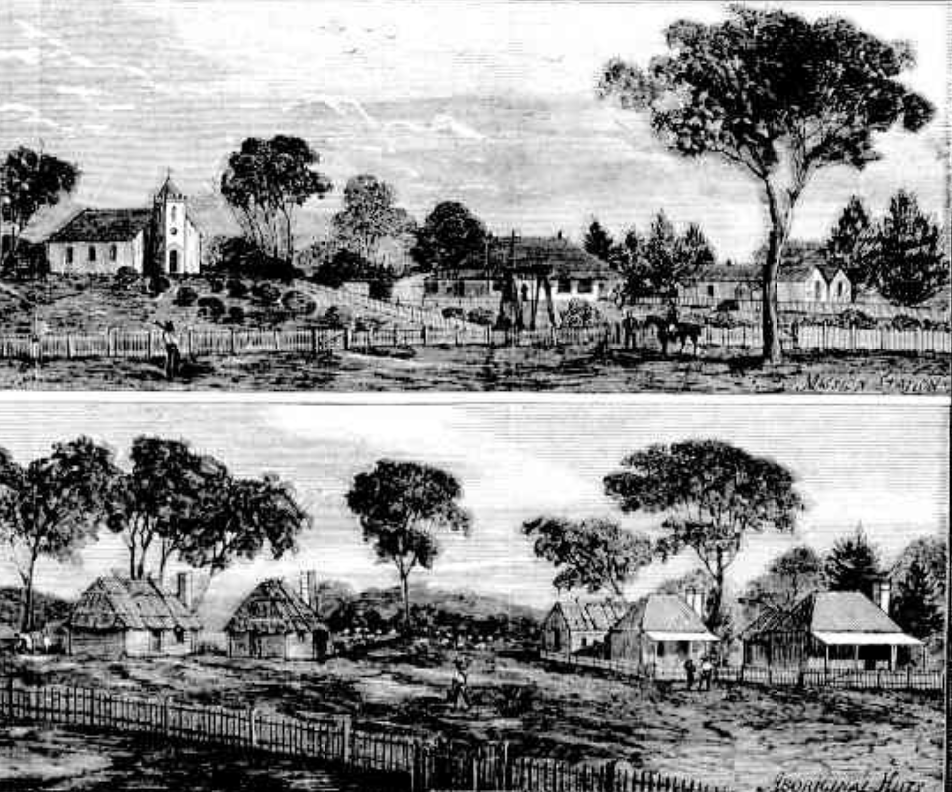
Ebenezer Aboriginal Station, in 1882

In December 1878, Louisa and her minor children arrived at the Ebenezer Aboriginal Station near Lake Hindmarsh. The missionary in charge of the station hired her as a nurse and laundress, but repeatedly wrote letters to the board about the behaviour of her children. In response to an inquiry from the manager of Coranderrk as to whether the married children there should be reunited with her at Ebenezer, the missionary rejected the idea because keeping the family divided in different places would lessen their influence on other residents. Of Louisa, he wrote, "Mrs. Briggs works very hard, only that she is too indulgent with her children". In fact, Louisa and her children continued to protest treatment of the Aboriginal people. She wrote letters in 1878 and 1881 to the board about the scarcity of food at Ebenezer Station, and other family members wrote letters describing the poor conditions and comparing the mission to the Coranderrk reserve. These letters caused distress to the residents at Ebenezer who realised they were given less wages and rations, and for the residents of Coranderrk because the board's new plan was to relocate residents from the reserve and sell the land. However, the letters had the effect of increasing the wages and rations at Ebenezer to equal those at Coranderrk.

Annual reports from 1881 and 1882 confirm that neither the Coranderrk or Ebenezer stations were able to provide adequate rations or wages for the residents' support. Unrest continued at both stations and Louisa pressed to be allowed to be reunited with her family at Coranderrk. In March 1882, she was finally allowed and left Ebenezer with three of her unmarried daughters. They arrived at Coranderrk station in April, and Louisa was reinstated as dormitory matron. Although legislation passed which confirmed Coranderrk as a permanent mission in 1883, the sentiments of the government, public, and media were that only full-blooded Aboriginals should be supported. A move was implemented, but not codified by legislation until 1886, to require biracial people over the age of thirty-five to leave the reserves and be assimilated into the White culture. Despite being legally designated as White, discrimination against mixed-race people made it difficult for them to find employment and housing.

== Displacement ==
Louisa's son Jack found refuge at the Maloga Mission and in May 1885, Louisa, her daughters Polly and Caroline, and Louisa's granddaughter Maggie Kerr, step-daughter of her daughter Margaret. Jack's wife died at Maloga and Louisa took over the care of their children. Although Louisa appealed to the board to be allowed to return to Coranderrk station, her requests were denied. Laura Barwick stated that the board refused on the grounds that Louisa was Tasmanian. Diane Barwick said that the board refused because they had plans to close the station again and offered her housing at a remote settlement in Gippsland. Pasco supported her petition to return, but the board secretary refused because admitting her would mean admitting all of her children and the policy was to remove biracial residents from the stations. In 1889, Louisa and the family moved from Maloga to the Cummeragunja Reserve, near Barmah. A new board secretary was appointed that year to oversee Aboriginal affairs. He had never met Louisa or her family, but according to Diane Barwick treated them as Tasmanians and strictly adhered to the policy of assimilation for biracial people. When Louisa wrote asking to return to Coranderrk in 1892, he rejected the request.

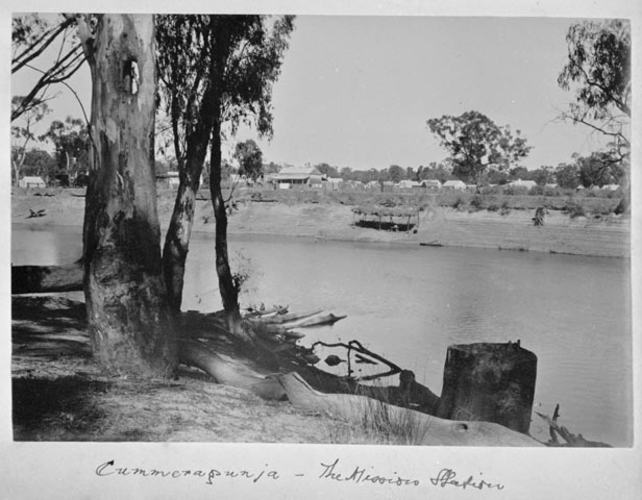
Cummeragunja Station, 1893

In 1895, the policy of excluding biracial people was extended to the Cummeragunja Reserve. Louisa and other exiles settled in a camp on the opposite side of the Murray River near Barmah. Her request for rations because of her age and ancestry submitted to the board in 1903 was rejected because she was Tasmanian. There are few records to indicate where Louisa lived for the next two decades. It is known that she had returned to the Cummeragunja Reserve by 1923, when The Sun News-Pictorial published a photograph of her describing her as the "last of her race". The article called her Lucy Briggs, stated that she was one hundred years old, and was born in Tasmania. Hall and Taylor, who interviewed her at the Cummeragunja Reserve in 1924, chose her as a subject believing she was Tasmanian, but Louisa maintained her ancestry was Victorian.

== Death and legacy ==
Louisa Briggs died at the Cummeragunja Reserve, New South Wales, on 6 or 8 September 1925, and was buried at the cemetery on the reserve. (Note: Barwick and The Age give the date of death as 6 September; while The Queensland Times and The West Australian reported her death as occurring on 8 September.) Based upon ancestry, descendants from five abducted women, Louisa, Jane Foster, Elizabeth Maynard, Margery Munro, and Eliza Nowen were accepted by the Victorian Aboriginal Heritage Council as apical ancestors from whom Boonwurrung descent is established. Since 2017, the Bunurong Land Council Aboriginal Corporation has been the Registered Aboriginal Party representing the Boonwurrung people, whose territory and responsibility over protection of cultural heritage was defined by a 2021 boundary compromise. The Bunurong Land Council Aboriginal Corporation challenged the heritage of Louisa, who is officially recognised as a foundational ancestor by the state of Victoria in a 2023 case filed in the Federal Court of Australia. The Bunurong Land Council Aboriginal Corporation claim that Louisa was Tasmanian was in response to a challenge by the Boon Wurrung Land and Sea Foundation of Jane Foster, Elizabeth Maynard, and Eliza Nowan as apical ancestors.

Louisa was among the Aboriginal women honoured with bronze plaques erected in the Pioneer Women's Memorial Garden in Melbourne for the 150th anniversary of Victoria in 1985. In 2006, Louisa's biography was published in the Australian Dictionary of Biography, supplement, which included previously overlooked Australians, including forty-nine Aboriginal people. A play and book of the same name, Coranderrk: We Will Show the Country, were presented in 2013, which retold the story of the people who lived at Coranderrk Aboriginal Station. The story was taken from the minutes of the 1881 Parliamentary Inquiry into residents's complaints against the Victorian Board for the Protection of Aborigines. Originally produced by the Ilbijerri Aboriginal and Torres Strait Islander Theatre Company, Giordano Nanni and the playwright Andrea James, a Yorta Yorta woman, rewrote the script for a theatrical performance held at the Belvoir Theatre in Sydney in December 2013 and January 2014. Louisa's story was included in the play, and is also retold at Site 31 on the Bayside Coastal Indigenous Trail in Victoria. Caroline Martin, a descendant of Louisa, partnered with the Ilbijerri Theatre Company in 2018 to produce Bagurrk (woman in the Boonwurrung language). The play recounted Louisa's life through the letters she wrote and was intended to explore "the legacy of First Nations women's resistance".
