= Mount Cottrell massacre =

Massacre in Victoria, Australia

- Location: 37°46′08″S 144°38′02″E; Mount Cottrell, Victoria
- Date: 16 July 1836; At dawn – (UTC+11:00)
- Target: Wathaurong people
- Attack type: Attack at dawn following observation during previous evening.
- Weapons: Assailants: Muskets; Defenders: Uncertain
- Deaths: Around 10 (up to 35?) Aboriginal people
- Injuries: Unknown
- Victim: Names unknown
- Perpetrator: A group of 17 men
- Assailants: Henry Batman; Mr Guy; George Hollins; Michael Leonard; David Pitcairn; Alexander Thomson; William Winberry; John Wood; Aboriginal men: Benbow, Derrimutt, Baitlange (Ben Benger) and Ballyan; Sydney Aboriginal men: Bullett, Stewart and Joe the marine
- No. of participants: 17 assailants and around 10 victims
- Defender: 50–100 Wathaurong
- Motive: Revenge for killing of Charles Franks and Thomas Flinders
- Inquiry: Investigation by Port Phillip Magistrate William Lonsdale sometime after late September 1836
- Accused: None
- Charges: None
- Verdict: None
- Convictions: None
- Convicted: None
- Litigation: None

The Mount Cottrell massacre involved the murder of an estimated 10 Wathaurung people near Mount Cottrell in the colony of Victoria in 1836, in retaliation for the killing of two European settlers.

== Timeline ==
Squatter Charles Franks was employed by farmer George Armytage to secure land from Indigenous Australians. Franks was later speared to death while he was attempting to claim land in Geelong. Franks was accompanied by convict shepherd Thomas Flinders; both men were killed a member of the Wathaurung tribe. Franks is known to have used lead to make "what he called blue pills for the natives". Some historians believe that Franks was referring to lacing bullock carcasses with strychnine to poison Indigenous Australians, which was a common practice at the time.

Franks, in partnership with George Smith and Armytage, had been near Mount Cottrell, just to the west of where members of the Port Phillip Association had appropriated their land in the Port Phillip District of New South Wales. Franks had arrived at Point Gellibrand (modern day Williamstown) on 23 June with 500 sheep and had reached the Mount Cottrell area by 2 July. Franks and Smith pitched their tent close to thick bushland "eight miles" from the nearest station. Smith left the camp to get supplies from the port. According to a newspaper report at the time, soon afterward Franks and Flinders were visited by five Aboriginal people (two men, two women and a boy). Armytage and a squatter named Malcolm Malcolm discovered the remains of Franks and Flinders near their hut after a period of them being missing. Their bodies had been mutilated.

A group of men gathered at Franks’ station to set out to find the murderers, with Aboriginal trackers, including a Bunorong man called Derrimut. A few days later a group of about 80 Indigenous Australians were tracked down. The party of 17 men – Henry Batman, Mr Guy, George Hollins, Michael Leonard, David Pitcairn, Alexander Thomson, William Winberry, John Wood; Aboriginal men Benbow, Derrimut, Baitlange (Ben Benger) and Ballyan, and Sydney Aboriginal men Bullett, Stewart and Joe the marine – went in search of the Indigenous Australians, armed with muskets. They tracked a group of about 80 Aboriginal people "at no great distance" from where Franks and Flinders were murdered, and watched them during the evening. At dawn on 16 July 1836, the party attacked from about 91 metres (100 yd), firing on the group, resulting in the death of many Aboriginal people.

Some early media reports of the incident stated that 5 Aboriginal people were killed, though the The Cornwall Chronicle (published in Tasmania) reported a few days later that the group had succeeded in "annihilating them". According to Aboriginal oral history, there were 35 victims. Research in 2021 by the University of Newcastle suggests that ten were killed.

== Aftermath ==
Media at the time were divided, as the "Colony has to deplore the loss of one of its brightest ornaments". Some championed the revenge:

The barbarous murders of Mr. Franks and his shepherd, have been, in some degree, revenged, which, we trust, will be a warning to the natives, not in future to commit wanton excesses upon our countrymen.

Others were critical of the lawless nature of the killing. The Tasmanian Colonial Times stated:

This will not end here - a tribe swept off from the face of the earth so illegally - so diabolically - will require retributive justice. Good heaven! Is a whole community to be murdered in cold blood for the offence of three? - This is indeed visiting the sins of the father upon the children. Every human being, save the Port Philip jobbers, will look with horror on such proceedings; and this very act alone ought to destroy the settlement.

Newly appointed Port Phillip Magistrate William Lonsdale landed at Point Gellibrand months later (around late September 1836) to formalise the settlement of Melbourne, after which he undertook an investigation into the incident. Party members were interviewed and admitted firing on the Aboriginal group, but said that they were unaware if any were wounded.

The event was notable at the time, as Franks was the first free settler to be killed (convicts had been killed previously) in frontier violence in new European colony of Port Phillip. The reprisal raid foreshadowed similar conflict that would take place across Victoria's western district.

== See also ==
- List of massacres of Indigenous Australians
