= Arweet =

Arweet/Ngarweet is an important tribal position in the Boonwurrung and Wathaurong peoples of the Indigenous Australian Kulin alliance who live from Western Port, Port Phillip, Geelong to Ballarat. An Arweet is a leader or headman and holds a similar tribal standing as a ngurungaeta of the Wurundjeri people.

Notable Arweet include:

- Derrimut (1810c - 1864), arweet of the Yalukit-willam clan of the Boonwurrung people
- Ningerranarro (died 1847) also known as Old Benbow of the Boonwurrung
- Noonallaboon (1842–1844), Burrumbeet balug of the Wathaurong
- Balybalip also called Bullurp Bullurp, Bil-le-bil-lup, and King Billy of Ballarat (c.1823-1881), Burrumbeet balug
- Carolyn Briggs
