= Carolyn Briggs =

Indigenous Australian elder and councillor

N'arweet Carolyn Briggs AM
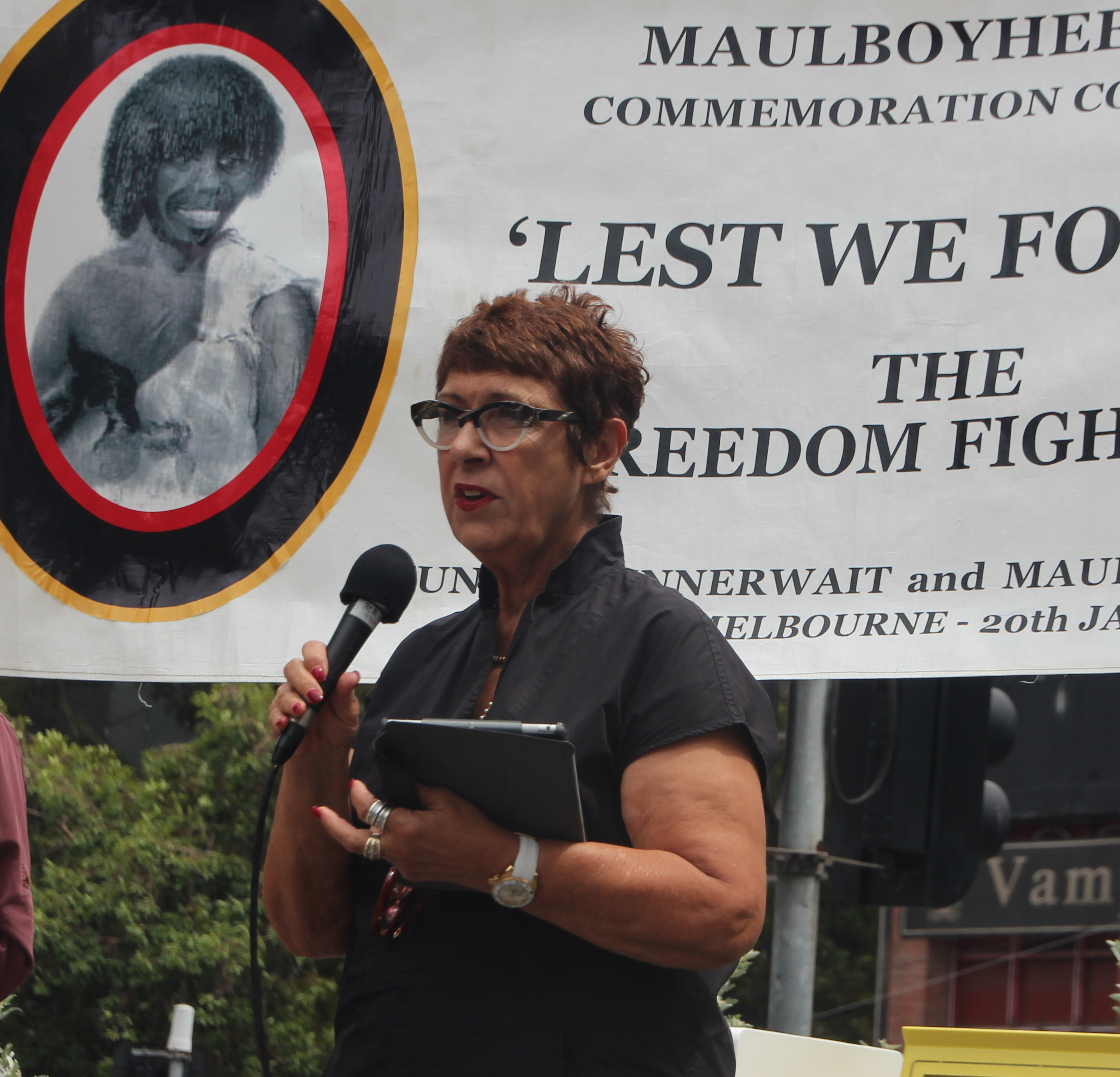
- Carolyn Briggs conducting a Welcome to Country ceremony in 2018.
- Education: RMIT University, PhD, 2020
- Relatives: Louisa Briggs (great-grandmother)

N’arweet Carolyn Briggs AM is an Aboriginal Australian rights activist. She is a Yaluk-ut Weelam and Boonwurrung elder, and serves as the Boonwurrung representative in the City of Port Phillip.

== Biography ==
Briggs is the great-granddaughter of Louisa Briggs, who as a child was abducted by seal hunters before later returning to the Kulin nation with her husband, John Briggs, who also survived abduction. Briggs was born in Melbourne.

She first attended Monash University in the 1970s, and completed her Doctorate in Philosophy (Media and Communications) at RMIT University in 2020. In the 1970s, she opened the first Aboriginal child care service in the Dandenong Ranges.

In 2005, she established the Boon Wurrung Foundation, to conduct cultural research, including for the restoration of the Boon Wurrung language. She serves as its chair. Briggs is the Boon Wurrung representative to the City of Port Phillip.

She was awarded the National Aboriginal Elder of the Year in 2011 by the National NAIDOC Committee. She was inducted into the Victorian Honour Roll of Women in 2005. She was awarded a Member of the Order of Australia (AM) as part of the 2019 Queen’s Birthday Honours list.
