= Ellen Atkinson =

(1894–1965) Aboriginal community leader

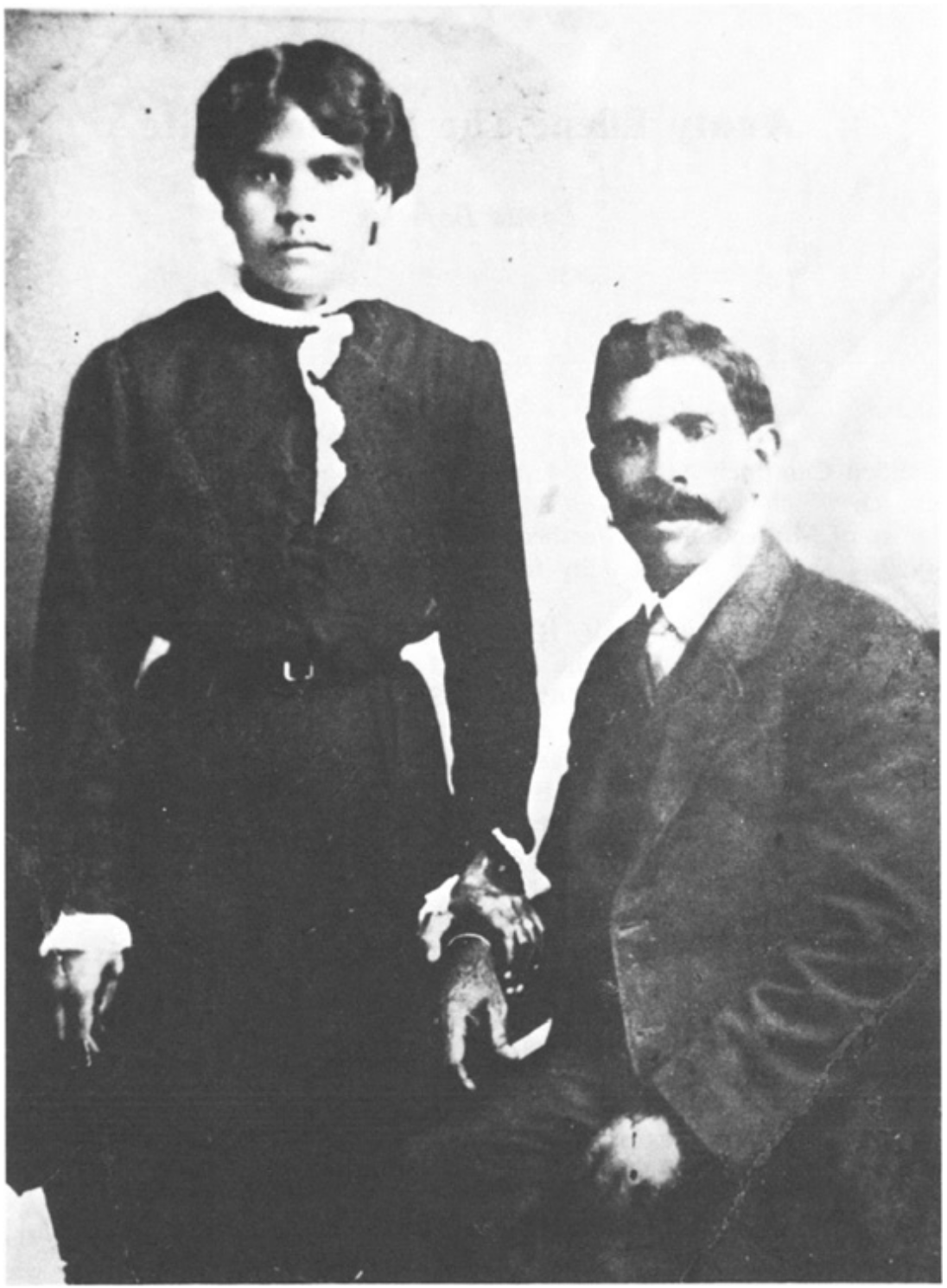
- Ellen Campbell Atkinson and Edwin Atkinson at their wedding in Echuca, 3 May 1911.
- Born: Ellen Campbell c. August 1894; Madowla Park, near Echuca, Victoria, Australia
- Died: 30 April 1965 (aged 70–71); Mooroopna, Victoria, Australia
- Resting place: Mooroopna Cemetery
- Other name: Aunty Ellen
- Occupation: Aboriginal community leader
- Spouse: Edwin Atkinson (m. 1911; died 1952)
- Children: 4

Ellen Campbell Atkinson (née Campbell; c. August 1894 – 30 April 1965) was an Australian Aboriginal community leader. Born in Madowla Park, near Echuca in Victoria, Atkinson and her family were forced to move frequently, either through the necessity of finding work, or forcibly by authorities. She converted to Christianity when the Aborigines' Inland Mission (AIM) visited the Cummeragunja Reserve, where she was living, and served the mission for many years in roles such as organist and deacon.

Atkinson supported key Aboriginal activists including William Ferguson, William Cooper, Jack Patten and Thomas Shadrach James, and participated in the Cummeragunja walk-off. At the end of her life she finally saw the building of her church, which she found bittersweet as her husband Edwin "Eddy" Atkinson, who was also a key figure in the church community, had not lived to see the culmination of his life's work.

== Early life ==
Atkinson's father, Alick Campbell, was a "half-caste" Aboriginal stockman and a widower who had followed his first wife, Emma Jackson Patterson, from Ganawarra Station (near Kerang) to Coranderrk. When his first wife died he married Elizabeth Briggs Charles, and Ellen was born at Madowla Park, near Echuca, in August 1894. Atkinson had sixteen siblings: seven from Alick's previous marriage, seven from Elizabeth's previous marriage and three full sisters, though one, Jemima, died at birth.

The Campbell family had a dislocated history. Ellen's mother was born to John Briggs and his "quarter-caste Aboriginal" wife, Louisa. Diane Barwick claimed that Loiusa's mother, Mary—herself a "half-caste" Aboriginal—and grandmother, Marjorie, had been kidnapped in 1833 from Point Nepean by sealers before Mary later married John Strugnell, a former chimney sweeper who had been transported to Australia in 1818 at the age of 17. Louisa married John Briggs in Tasmania in 1844, and later moved to Mount Cole where John worked on the Goldfields region of Victoria as a shepherd whilst Louisa worked as a midwife.

Before Ellen was born, Alick Campbell had found it increasingly hard to get adequate work, so returned to Ganawarra Station. In the meantime, the Campbell family had been forced out of Coranderrk to the Maloga Mission, which was across the Murray River. After Alick became sick, he requested food and provisions for his 15 children, which was denied because the Board for the Protection of Aborigines accused him of spending his money on alcohol, though they eventually sent him blankets. The family later settled in the Cummeragunja Reserve in New South Wales on condition Alick would declare they would never again seek the aid of the Board or return to Victoria. This was not their preferred home as Louisa was living in Corranderk; however, even when a Member of the New South Wales Legislative Assembly supported Campbell's petitions to return to Corranderk, he was told that it was forbidden as it was against the law. At Cummerangunja the Campbell children received a basic education by preacher, teacher and doctor Thomas Shadrach James.

== Married life and conversion to Christianity ==
Ellen married Edwin "Eddy" Atkinson on 3 May 1911 in Christ Church, Echuca. Edwin Atkinson's father, also named Eddy, was born in Cummeragunja and made a great impression on Ellen, who described him as a "skilled shearer, clever carpenter and a 'leader of his people'". Eddy was living in Cummeragunja at the time and Ellen was working at Strathmerton pastoral station, and before her marriage was in danger of being taken away from her family by authorities. Life on Cummeragunja was difficult as, though farming there was well run and highly productive, in 1907 the authorities revoked the blocks under the pretence that they were mismanaged.

When the non-sectarian Christian Aborigines' Inland Mission (AIM) visited Cummeragunja, both Eddy and Ellen converted to Christianity and became deacons and organists in an independent church that sprung up there. Eddy took over from his uncle, Doug Nicholls, when he retired in 1922 and was to be an unpaid preacher and pastor to a congregation amongst a dwindling populace as the authorities started to increasingly disperse residents of the reserve under the increased powers of the Aborigines Protection Act.

The couple had four children, born between 1919 and 1927. During this time the couple managed on an increasingly subsistence living as farming at Cummeragunja had been ceased, and, forced to make ends meet, would travel to Victoria in season to work as fruit-pickers. Atkinson later told Aboriginal researcher Diane Barwick that family was important and would support each other, saying that "We've had nothing this week—and we've had nothing before. But we've never begged; we've battled along. Our families always help each other."

The Atkinsons were active in the Barham mission. Eddy was first mentioned in AIM's monthly newsletter in July 1921 as addressing services there, and in May 1925 was made a "native helper" before being appointed a "Native Missionary" in 1928. Ellen would be the organist whilst Eddy led the congregation. By 1929, AIM had reported that the Atkinsons had a "flock of over 200 people". After 1930 Eddy became very sick and W. B. Payne took over from him. The Atkinsons were increasingly involved in preaching and pastoral care, and Eddy spoke at a number of AIM conventions from 1930 to 1935, including the Barham, Goolagong, and Moonah Cullah station conventions, though were unable to get to a later Moonah Cullah convention as Eddy was injured when his horse had an accident.

The Atkinsons' ministry with AIM came to a halt in 1935, however, after Payne spoke out about the "indifferences of churches to Australian aborigines". Payne was then removed and the Atkinsons ceased working for AIM. Payne and the Atkinsons moved to the Church of Christ, bringing over a number of their congregation, which caused some consternation for AIM, who wrote that "[on reaching Cummeragunja with the Memorial Van] Mr Long was confronted with a serious situation, through one, who was our representative, dividing the Native Church and taking with him a portion of it." The Atkinsons and Paynes remained good friends and the Atkinsons' daughter Daisy was taken in by the Paynes so that she could get an education, which she could not get at Cummeragunja.

== Cummerangunja walk-off and aftermath ==
In 1934 a new manager, J. G. Danvers, was appointed to Cummerangunja. Danvers ignored the policies of the time and provided much needed rations to the Aboriginal community, however he left on being promoted to the Menindle Aboriginal reserve. After Danvers' departure, life for the Aboriginals living in Cummerangunja steadily worsened and, despite lobbying by Eddy Atkinson's uncle, William Cooper, conditions did not change. The Australian Aborigines' League was eventually established by Cooper in Sydney, and later a division was formed in Melbourne by William Ferguson, who was a father-in-law to one of the Atkinsons' nieces. Despite a Select Committee conducting an inquiry into the reserves in 1937, nothing changed. Matters reached a head when Jack Patten, who had become president of the Sydney league, read the committee's report and warned the Aboriginal community at Cummerangunja that the Board planned to turn it into a closed compound, control their earnings and take away children. As a result, 170 people who were part of the Atkinsons' community crossed the Murray to camp at Burmah in what was known as the Cummeragunja walk-off and Patten was charged with "inciting Aborigines to leave their reserve".

Fourteen days later, the Atkinsons moved with their community to Burmah. They had been entrusted with money for food for those who left, and the new manager of Cummerangunja, a Mr A. J. McQuigan, had threatened Eddy and ordered him to "remain neutral and not to help the people who had left". The Atkinsons eventually moved to Mooroopna in 1941, following many in their community who moved there as work was more readily available because it was a fruit growing centre. They later moved to Melbourne, yet again following and ministering to their community—many of whom had found paid work in factories. Some time after they moved back to Cummerangunja and continued to support Ferguson and James, who continued making deputations to the Minister for the Interior. In the meantime the division between AIM and the Church of Christ had been healed in 1943 when they both conducted joint services praying for the men serving in World War II. The Atkinsons later moved their ministry to Mooroopna. After many lost their homes from severe flooding in March 1950, the government built a three-roomed weatherboard hut and, as parishioners guaranteed the Atkinsons' rent, they moved into this as their rental home in April 1951.

== Later life and death ==
On 2 November 1952 Eddy Atkinson died. Atkinson told Diane Barwick that "Eddy worked so hard for the people [and] the doctor told me his heart just gave out." After her husband's death, Atkinson urged the Church of Christ leadership to accept her son, Geoff, as pastor but was largely ignored and Doug Nicholls was made the pastor. Eventually there was a split in the church as James started his own independent church. According to Barwick, "this division of her family and community grieved Ellen. She was grateful for the genuine kindness of some clergymen and wanted Eddy's church to survive as his memorial. But she also resented the paternalism and regretted that Geoff was not helped to carry on his father's work."

The Aboriginal community had many people living on a patch of land in Mooroopna that was high enough to escape flooding—this patch of land was known as Daish's paddock. By 1946 James had secured promises to transfer ownership of the 150 acres of land to his community to build houses, instead it was converted into a rubbish tip. By 1956 there were proposals to integrate those living in Mooroopna into Housing Commission homes, but this resulted in sustained and vitriolic opposition from non-Aboriginal residents of nearby townships. Later, however, McCallum notes that a press clipping (of unknown origin) at the time recorded that "Speakers at public meetings 'slated the "filthy", "unhygenic", "disgraceful" and "Communist breeding" conditions of Daish's paddock and in some cases condemned the local municipal bodies for their tolerance of a vice ridden and degrading environment'", resulting in plans for a proposed subdivision of twenty-two rowed blocks (building and land on what was Daish's paddock is now managed by the Rumbalara Aboriginal Co-operative). Later, after the police committed twenty-four children as state wards, Atkinson lamented that "It would have been better to help their parents keep them. Those mothers were doing their best. You can't keep children clean on a rubbish tip, when you have to carry every drop of water half a mile."

Population growth from the housing development allowed the Church of Christ to donate enough money to allow the building of an Aboriginal church, by voluntary labour, that adjoined the Atkinsons' house. When it was opened, Barwick reported that Atkinson "had wept when they handed her the keys: 'It was the church they promised Eddy.'" The opening was attended by over 300 people and was officiated by Doug Nicholls.

In 1960 the late anthropologist, historian and Aboriginal-rights activist Diane Barwick met and spent four months interviewing Atkinson. In her article "Aunty Ellen: The Pastor's Wife" she wrote that "I did not plan, all those years ago, to write her life story. I do so now as a tribute to a woman who deeply influenced my life." Barwick recounted that her time with Atkinson was at first reserved, but changed in time. She wrote that,

At first our conversations were limited to the topics appropriate between strangers. I was shy and afraid of being impertinent; she was kind yet implacable in her skilful management of interviews. She had played an important role in interpreting koories' (Aborigines') needs to gubba (European) sympathisers during forty years of church work. Initially she saw me as yet another inquiring gubba to be instructed and gently manipulated as a potential resource for her community. But our relationship changed, just because I was a young girl without relatives and needed help. Her people have, I think, a special kindness for waifs and strays bereft of family, perhaps because their own identity is based upon kinship ties.

Atkinson remained a prominent community leader until her death on 30 August 1965 at Mooroopna. She was buried in Mooroopna local cemetery.
