= John Shillinglaw =

Australian public servant and historian (1831–1905)

John Joseph Shillinglaw FRGS, (30 September 1831 – 26 May 1905), was a public servant, author and historian in Australia.

Shillinglaw was born in London, the eldest son of John Shillinglaw and his wife Emma Nicholas, née Taylor. John senior (who died in 1862) was librarian of the Royal Geographical Society. Along with his father and brothers, John Joseph emigrated to Victoria, arriving in October 1852. Shillinglaw was employed in the Government service at intervals from that time. In 1856 he was selected as Government Shipping Master, to administer certain of the Imperial laws relating to seamen, then just adopted in Victoria, and in this position he remained until, on a general reduction in the departments in 1869, he retired from the Civil Service with compensation. He was reappointed to the Civil Service in 1875, and successively held the appointments of Secretary to the Police Superannuation and Police Medical Boards, and the Central Board of Health. He was Secretary to the Royal Commission on Vegetable Products.

In 1870 Shillinglaw became proprietor and editor of the Colonial Monthly magazine. He published "Arctic Discovery" in 1850, and in 1865 edited "Cast Away on the Aucklands," a book which the Times said was as interesting as Robinson Crusoe. In 1858 he compiled a "Shipmaster's Guide," for Victorian mariners. Some early annals of the colony, which he discovered in 1878, were printed by Parliament under the title of "Historical Records of Port Phillip."
