= Yalukit =

Indigenous inhabitants of the region around Williams Town Melbourne

The Yalukit or Yalukit-willam people are a constituent clan of the Boonwurrung peoples. The Yalukit are the earliest Aboriginal inhabitants of the central bay-side region of Melbourne (Birrarung-ga). The Yalukit have inhabited the central bay-side areas of Melbourne for thousands of years.

== Country ==
Yalukit territory extends eastwards from the Werribee River, through to Williamstown, Sandridge and St Kilda.

== Etymology ==
The name Yalukit-willam means "river home" or "people of the river", referring to the Yarra and Maribyrnong River.

== Traditional life ==
The Yalukit traditionally practised tool manufacturing, ochre collection, and burning of the landscape to allow for renewal of the flora and fauna. The Yalukit land currently occupied by Central Melbourne is a major meeting place for the Kulin Nation where social events, ceremonies, marriages, initiations, trade, and judicial matters are conducted. Yalukit people are of the Bundjil moiety and so were required to marry outside of the clan to people of the Waa moiety in the surrounding Kulin nation; married Yalukit women would move away from Yalukit lands to live with other clans. Yalukit people hunted kangaroo, birds, eels and other seafood, and gathered edible plants such as wattle gum. While men primarily hunted the large game, women were also capable of doing so. The work required to sustain the clan could take as little as five hours a day. Food was shared freely with those less able within the clan.

Decision-making within the clan was conducted by a senior council which met to discuss serious issues such as clan movements, inter-tribal business, or to resolve interpersonal conflict. As winter approached, the clan would move upstream to drier areas that were less prone to flooding.

Clothing was sewn from animal skins and furs including possum and kangaroo and also woven from plant materials. Hair was kept long and decorated with claws, animal teeth, earthenware, and other accessories. The ears and nose could be pierced with animal bones and the face painted with ochre.

== Place names in Melbourne from the Yalukit dialect ==
- Williamstown: Kertbooruc / Koort-boork-boork - (a clump of she-oak trees at that site)
- Kororoit Creek: Kororoit - male kangaroo, said to be from kure (kangaroo) (Note: Alternatively, Koroit may refer to geothermal activity, smoking or hot ground (Clark 2011))

== Sources ==
- Clark, Ian D. (2011) [First published 2001]. THE YALUKIT-WILLAM: The First People of Hobsons Bay (PDF). Hobsons Bay City Council. ISBN 978-0-646-41669-4.
- Clark, Ian D.; Heydon, Toby (2004). A Bend in the Yarra: A History of the Merri Creek Protectorate Station and Merri Creek Aboriginal School 1841-1851. Aboriginal Studies Press. ISBN 978-0-855-75469-3.
- Eidelson, Meyer (2014). Yalukit William: The River People of Port Phillip. City of Port Phillip. ISBN 978-0-646-92065-8.
- Presland, Gary (1994) [First published 1985]. Aboriginal Melbourne. The lost land of the Kulin people. McPhee Gribble. ISBN 978-0-869-14346-9.
