= Derrimut (Indigenous Australian) =

Indigenous Australian leader

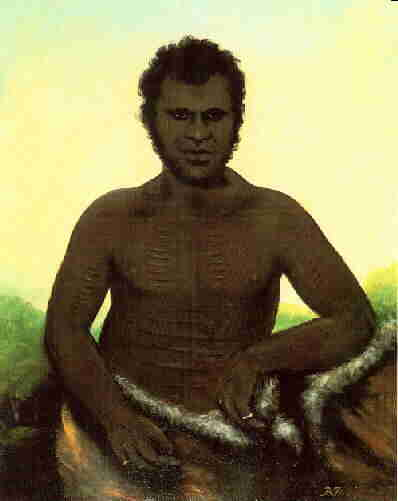
Portrait of Derremart by Benjamin Duterau, painted in 1837 during a visit to Hobart with J.P. Fawkner.

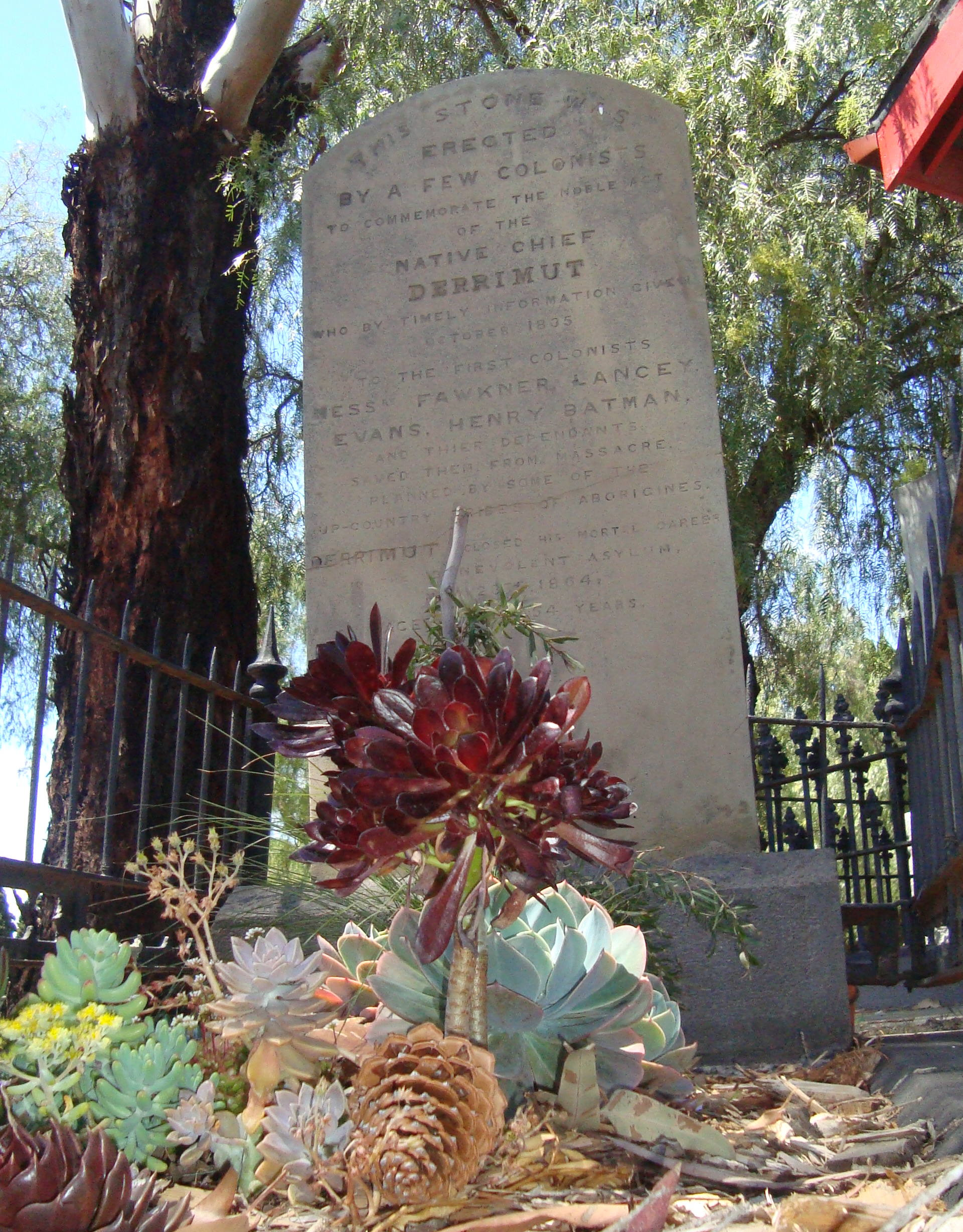
Derrimut's gravestone in Melbourne General Cemetery

Derrimut (also spelt Derremart or Terrimoot) (c. 1810 – 20 April 1864) was a headman or arweet of the Boonwurrung (Bunurong) people from the Melbourne area of Australia.

Derrimut was born around 1810, before European settlement of the colony of Victoria.

In October 1835 he informed the early European settlers of an impending attack by "up-country tribes". The colonists armed themselves, and the attack was averted. Benbow from the Bunurong and Billibellary, from the Wurundjeri, also acted to protect the colonists in what is perceived as part of their duty of hospitality.

He fought in the late 1850s and early 1860s to protect Boonwurrung rights to live on their land at Mordialloc Reserve. When the reserve was closed in July 1863, his people were forced to unite with the remnants of Woiwurrung and other Victorian Aboriginal communities to settle Coranderrk Mission station, near Healesville.

Derrimut became very disillusioned and died at the Melbourne Benevolent Asylum at the age of about 54 years on 20 April 1864. In his honour, over his body, interred in the Melbourne General Cemetery according to European rather than Aboriginal rites, a tombstone was erected. The text of his tombstone reads:

"This stone was erected by a few colonists To commemorate the noble act of the native Chief Derrimut who by timely information given October 1835 to the first colonists Messrs Fawkner, Lancey, Evans, Henry Batman and their dependants [sic] saved them from massacre, planned by some of the up-country tribes of Aborigines. Derrimut closed his mortal career in the Benevolent Asylum, May 28th 1864; aged about 54 Years"

The Melbourne suburb of Derrimut is named after him.

== See also ==
- List of Indigenous Australian historical figures
