= Aboriginal sites of Victoria =

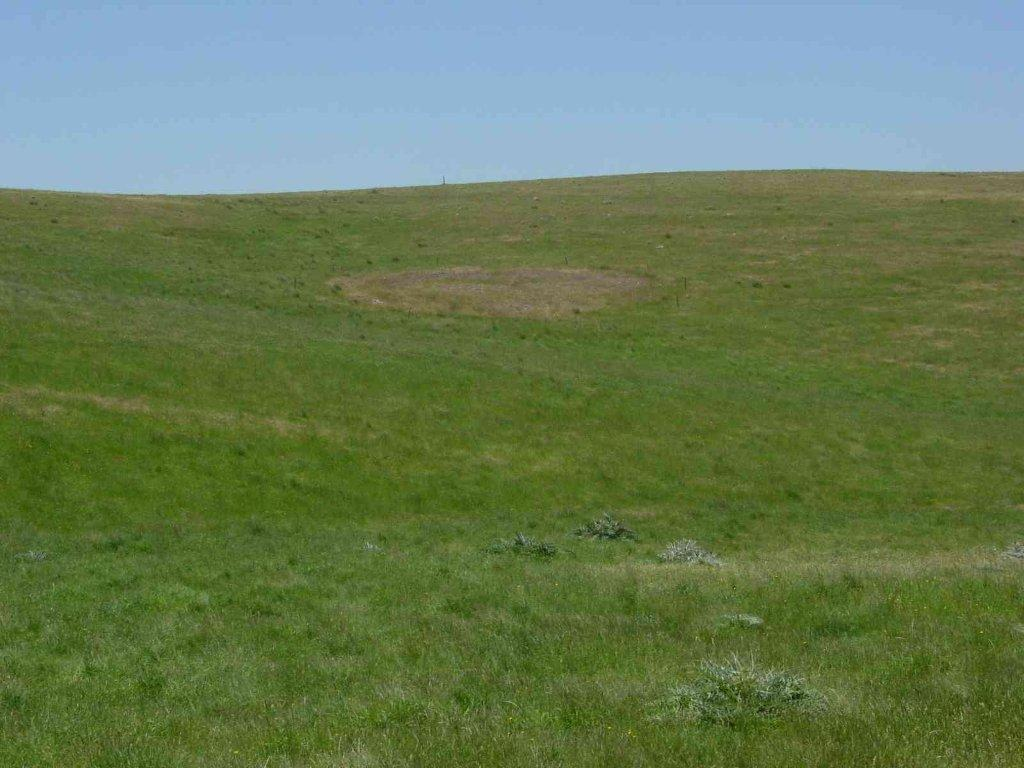
Riddells Road Earth Ring

Aboriginal sites of Victoria form an important record of human occupation for probably more than 40,000 years. They may be identified from archaeological remains, historical and ethnographic information or continuing oral traditions and encompass places where rituals and ceremonies were performed, occupation sites where people ate, slept and carried out their day to day chores, and ephemeral evidence of people passing through the landscape, such as a discarded axe head or isolated artefact.

Victorian Aboriginal sites include shell middens, scarred trees, cooking mounds, rock art, burials, ceremonial sites and innumerable stone artefacts. These stone flakes represent the tools Aboriginal people used, such as knives, spear points, scrapers and awls, and the waste material left behind when they were made. Commonly referred to as stone artefact scatters such sites can be found on the surface or exposed by ploughing or erosion, or through careful archaeological excavation.

== Types of sites ==
Scarred trees result from removing bark for the manufacture of shields, coolamons, shelters and other utensils can be found where appropriate species of tree of sufficient age survive. Some trees were marked with designs and symbols. A large river red gum with a canoe scar is located at Heide Gallery in Bulleen.

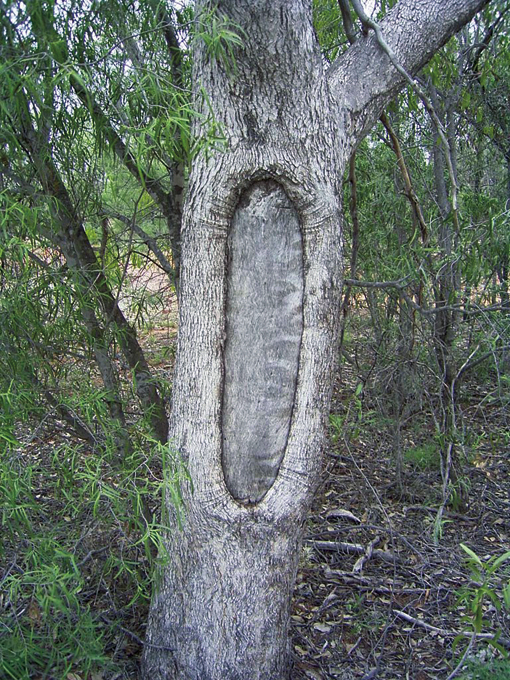
Scar tree from removal of bark for a shield, near Wahgunyah

There have been more than 60 rock art sites identified in the Grampians National Park which contains about 80% of the known Aboriginal rock art sites in Victoria, with a number of new discoveries after the fires of January 2006. They depict humans, human hands, animal tracks and birds, while some are open to the public and are readily accessible including: Billimina (Glenisla shelter), Jananginj Njani (Camp of the Emu's Foot), Manja (Cave of Hands), Larngibunja (Cave of Fishes), Ngamadjidj (Cave of Ghosts, from the word Ngamadjidj), and Gulgurn Manja (Flat Rock). Nearby Bunjil's Shelter, which illustrates Bunjil, the creator, is in the Black Range near Stawell. A painting thought to be of a thylacine (Tasmanian tiger) is noted from Mt Pilot and the paintings at Mudgegonga rock shelter in north-eastern Victoria are possibly 3,500 years old.

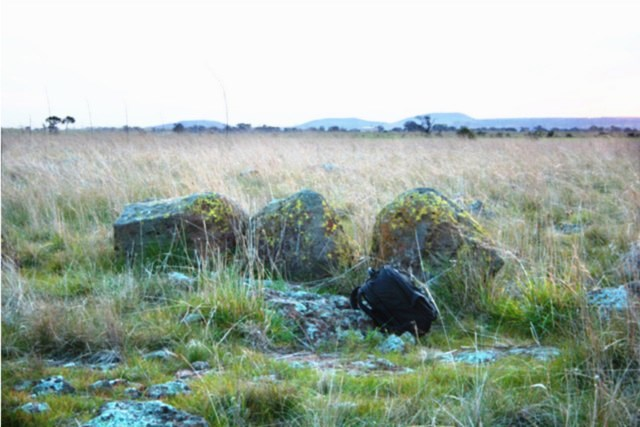
A small part of the Wurdi Youang stone arrangement

Ceremonial sites are rare, but two large stone arrangements have been found at Wurdi Youang near Mount Rothwell and Carisbrook. others have been identified from Oral tradition, although archaeological remains are no longer evident such as the Corroboree Tree at Richmond oval was a significant gathering place for the Wurundjeri people. A number of earth rings have been identified in Sunbury, which, although lacking historical or ethnographic evidence, have been interpreted as ceremonial Bora rings.

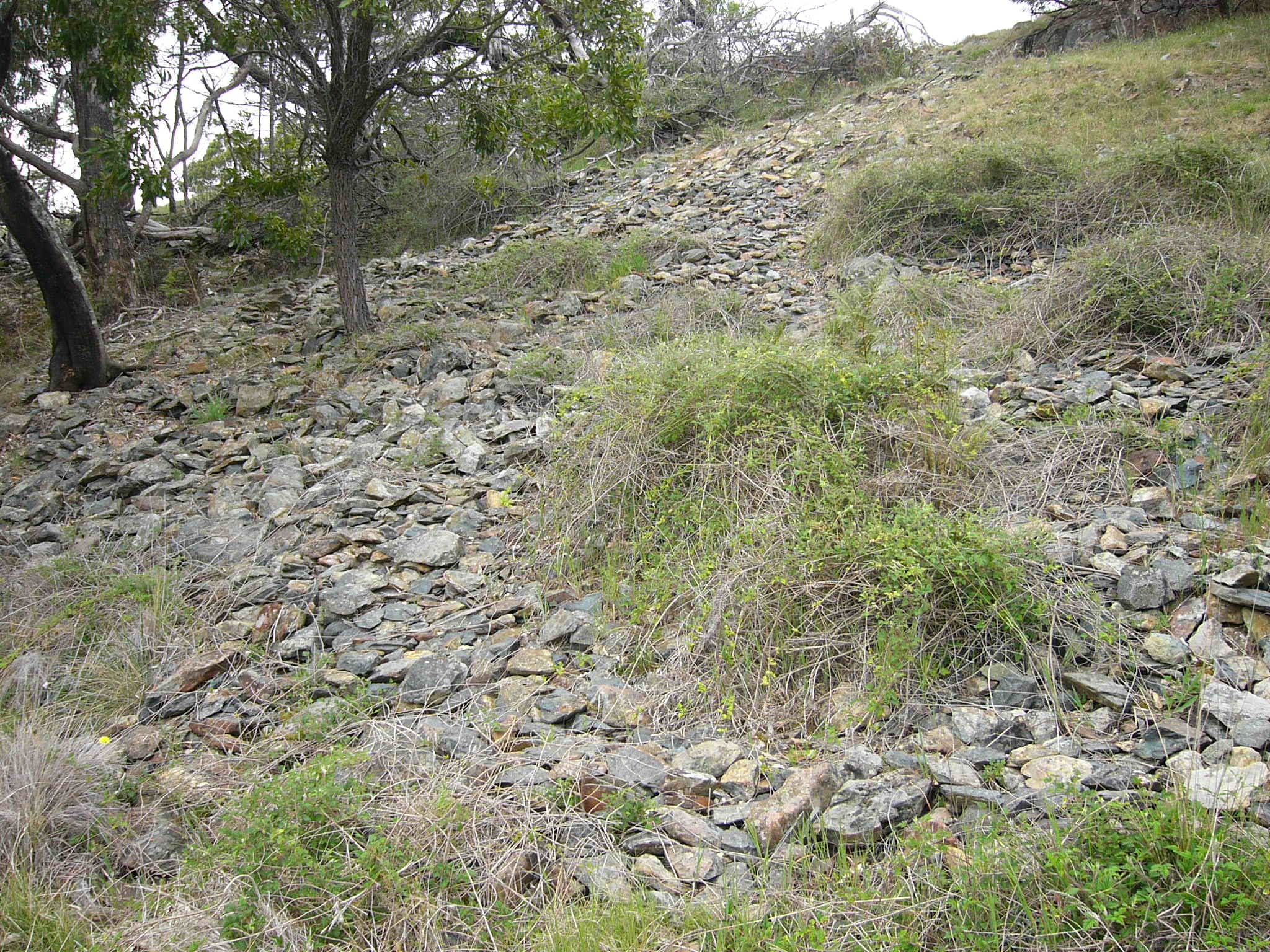
Mount William Quarry

Evidence of stone quarrying is rare, but the Mount William stone axe quarry is one of a number of stone sources used for making tools which were traded long distances throughout central and western Victoria and into New South Wales.

Only a relatively small number of burials have been identified in Victoria, most of which are associated with sand dunes along the coast or in the north west of the state. Kow Swamp is particularly significant for evidence of 13,000–year–old burial rituals using a headband of kangaroo incisors similar to those worn by Aboriginal people until recently, and for consistent burial practices over a long period. A burial on the banks of the Werribee river has been dated to about 7,300 BP.

Shell middens occur along most of the coastline and some lake-shores and river banks. Most of these were relatively recent (due to the mobile nature of sand) such as Seal Point and Moonlight Head in the Otway Ranges, although some like Mallacoota Inlet in eastern Gippsland have been dated to more than 2,500 BP, and Wilsons Promontory 6,500 years ago.

Large earth mounds were built up by deliberate transport of soil and the remains of clay heat retainers in hearths, the collapse of seasonally abandoned turf huts and camp activities. Examples have been found on the Hopkins River flood plain in central western Victoria, and in the Nyah Forest, the oldest is dated to about 2500 years ago.

Fish and eel traps were constructed on many rivers, and while most were probably of organic materials and have left little trace, some, such as at Lake Condah in western Victoria reveal complex systems of excavated channels and stone weirs, dated to 3,000 years ago. Stone artefacts found near the bones of now extinct megafauna at Lancefield in central Victoria have suggested Aboriginal people were living alongside giant marsupials 26,000 years ago.

While rock shelters are often the sites of cave painting and other art, they also provide deeply stratified occupation deposits because they are protected from erosion. New Guinea II cave on the Snowy River near Buchan has deposits more than 10 000 years old along with delicate cave paintings and engravings. Rock shelters were occupied in the Cape Bridgewater area about 12,000 years ago. Cloggs Cave rock shelter near Buchan, Victoria was occupied about 18,000 years ago, where bone tools and animal remains were found. At the Keilor Archaeological Site a human hearth excavated in 1971 was radiocarbon-dated to about 31,000 years BP, making Keilor one of the earliest sites of human habitation in Australia, while at Box Gully on Lake Tyrrell, emu eggs and other artefacts have been dated to 27,000 years ago.

Stone artefact scatters are among the most common site types and provide evidence of tool use and manufacture. These are often extensive surface scatters and deep stratified deposits of flaked finegrained stone, of lithic flakes. Much of this material is waste flakes, discarded during the manufacture process. Specific types of artefacts such as blades, scrapers or burins may indicate what the area was used for, for example processing animal skins. Stone artefact material is usually rine grained silcrete, chert, and quartz. Hornfels is an unusual and rare material, but is highly distinctive.

== Age and chronology ==
Archaeological evidence points to people first arriving in Australia around 50,000 BP and in Victoria shortly after. Sites over 22,000 years old have been found at Ghow Swamp Aboriginal Place and the Keilor archaeological site. A cranium found at the site has been dated at between 12,000 and 14,700 years BP.

The oldest archaeological site in the greater Melbourne area, and one of the most important, is at Keilor on the Maribyrnong River. A human skull discovered there in 1940 was later found to be around 13 000 years old, older than any other human remains found in Australia up to that time, and the find attracted worldwide attention. After small excavations in the 1960s and 1970s, archaeologists from La Trobe University and the Victoria Archaeological Survey (VAS) began an excavation that continued for five years finding a sequence of stone tools and butchered animal bone.

== Occupation patterns ==
Whilst most evidence of Aboriginal settlement is derived from camp sites where fireplaces, remains of stone tool making and sometimes structures such as mounds and huts can be found, and these sites are almost always located close to reliable water sources, the distribution of Aboriginal archaeological sites demonstrates occupation of all the climatic zones in Victoria, even during the extreme global climatic conditions at the peak of the Last Glacial Maximum when temperatures were colder, vast amounts of surface water were frozen in glaciers and sea levels were lower. Around 18,000 BP sea levels were about 65 metres below present day levels, while archaeological evidence has shown that people were present in south-eastern Australia throughout all of the climatic changes of at least the last 30,000 years ranging from the deep gorges and highlands of East Gippsland such as at Clogg's Cave, and New Guinea II cave, the riverine plains at Keilor, the inland plains and swamps such as Ghow Swamp, and the eastern ranges at the Grampians.

== Protection and management ==
Aboriginal archaeological sites and relics in Victoria are protected when a declaration is made under the Aboriginal Heritage Act 2006. The declared sites are administered by First Peoples – State Relations, an agency of the Victorian Government, in some instances through delegation to Registered Aboriginal Parties. All declared sites are recorded on the Victorian Aboriginal Heritage Register, as maintained by First Peoples – State Relations. As of December 2011, there were approximately 30,000 places and objects included on the register.

== List of notable sites ==
Site name	Status (date)	Area		Region	Coordinates	Notes
Site name	Status (date)	ha	acre	Region	Coordinates	Notes
Bend Road archaeological site		12	30	Melbourne	38°00′15″S 145°11′25″E	
Box Gully archaeological site				Loddon Mallee	35°13′40″S 142°51′12″E	
Budj Bim heritage areas – Lake Condah eel traps	World Heritage Site; 2019	6	15	Western District	38°04′S 141°55′E	(Note: The UNESCO World Heritage Site is much larger in area, some 9,935 ha (24,550 acres). This 6 ha (15-acre) area is an estimate that relates solely to the "eel traps".)
Carisbrook stone arrangement	Declared; 1975			Loddon Mallee	37°04′14″S 143°51′20″E	
Cloggs Cave				Gippsland	37°31′S 148°10′E	
Ghow Swamp Aboriginal Place	Declared; 2022	3,177	7,850	North Central	35°57′13″S 144°19′05″E	
Green Gully archaeological site				Melbourne	37°43′46″S 144°49′42″E	
Keilor archaeological site	Declared; 1976			Melbourne	37°42′15″S 144°50′16″E	
Lake Bolac stone arrangement	Declared; 1975			Western District	37°41′58″S 142°50′55″E	
Mount William stone axe quarry	Declared; 1976			North Central	37°12′38″S 144°48′37″E	
Mudgegonga rock shelter				Hume	36°29′02″S 146°53′05″E	
New Guinea II cave				Gippsland	37°23′05″S 148°21′04″E	
Sunbury earth rings – Correa Way – Hopbush Ave – Reservoir Road – Riddells Road – Wirilda Court	Declared;	708,934	1,751,810	Greater Melbourne	– 37°33′46″S 144°44′22″E – 37°33′44″S 144°44′29″E – 37°34′10″S 144°41′53″E – 37°33′12″S 144°42′11″E – 37°33′52″S 144°44′08″E	
Tarragal Caves				Barwon South West	38°19′07″S 141°24′29″E	
Wurdi Youang	VHR			Barwon South West	37°52′30″S 144°27′28″E	

== See also ==
- Indigenous Australians
- Aboriginal sacred site
- Registered Aboriginal Party
