= Registered Aboriginal Party =

Australian Aboriginal cultural guardians in Victoria, Australia

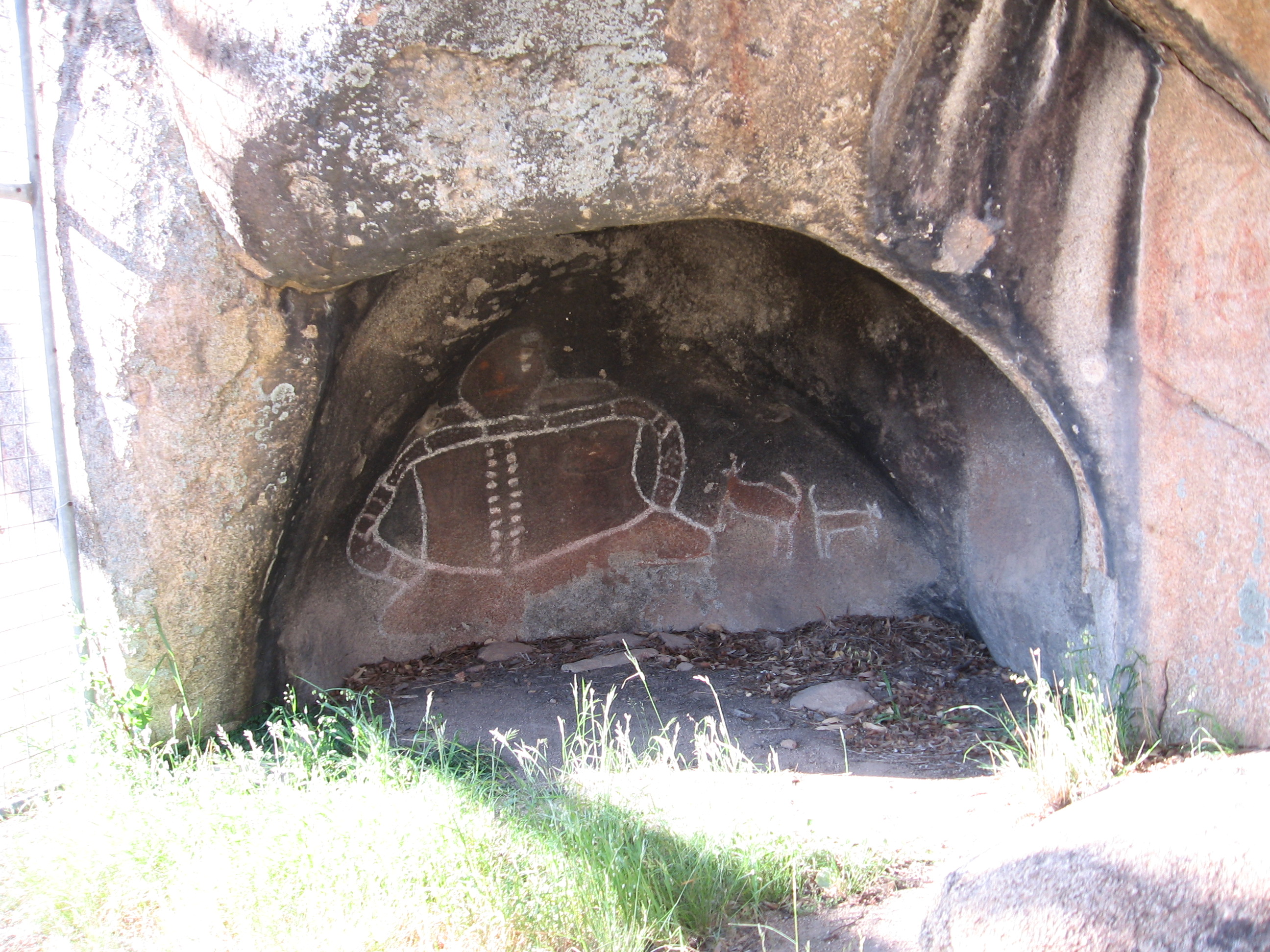
Aboriginal painting in Grampians National Park in Victoria, Australia

A Registered Aboriginal Party (RAP) is a recognised representative body of an Aboriginal Australian people per the Aboriginal Heritage Act 2006 (Vic.), whose function is to protect and manage the Aboriginal cultural heritage in the state of Victoria in Australia.

== Function ==
Registered Aboriginal Parties act as the "primary guardians, keepers and knowledge holders of Aboriginal cultural heritage" in Victoria.

They are the approximate equivalent to land councils (mostly in the Northern Territory) or Aboriginal or Indigenous corporations in the other states. If the body registers a claim with the National Native Title Tribunal under the Native Title Act 1993 (Cwth), they are referred to as a prescribed body corporate (PBC) until such time as a determination is made, when they become a Registered Native Title Body Corporate, or RNTBC, registered with the Office of the Registrar of Indigenous Corporations under the Corporations (Aboriginal and Torres Strait Islander) Act 2006 (Cwth).

According to the Department of Premier and Cabinet:

RAPs have responsibilities under the Act relating to the management of Aboriginal cultural heritage, including:

- evaluating Cultural Heritage Management Plans
- providing advice on applications for Cultural Heritage Permits
- making decisions about Cultural Heritage Agreements
- providing advice or application for interim or ongoing Protection Declarations.

== Current RAPs ==
Registered Aboriginal Parties as of 2024

Aboriginal people apply to the Victorian Aboriginal Heritage Council (VAHC), who determines which applicants will be registered as Registered Aboriginal Parties (RAPs).

As of December 2024, there are 12 registered parties, covering about 77.5% of Victoria:

- Barengi Gadjin Land Council Aboriginal Corporation
- Bunurong Land Council Aboriginal Corporation
- Dja Dja Wurrung Clans Aboriginal Corporation
- Eastern Maar Aboriginal Corporation
- First People of the Millewa Mallee Aboriginal Corporation
- Gunaikurnai Land and Waters Aboriginal Corporation
- Gunditj Mirring Traditional Owners Aboriginal Corporation
- Taungurung Clans Aboriginal Corporation
- Wamba Wemba Aboriginal Corporation
- Wathaurung Aboriginal Corporation
- Wurundjeri Woi Wurrung Cultural Heritage Aboriginal Corporation
- Yorta Yorta Nation Aboriginal Corporation

== See also ==
- Aboriginal sites of Victoria
- Victorian Aboriginal Heritage Register
