= Land council =

Organisation representing one or more groups of the Indigenous peoples of Australia

Land councils, also known as Aboriginal land councils, or land and sea councils, are Australian community organisations, generally organised by region, that are commonly formed to represent the Indigenous Australians (both Aboriginal Australians and Torres Strait Islander people) who occupied their particular region before the arrival of European settlers. They have historically advocated for recognition of traditional land rights, and also for the rights of Indigenous people in other areas such as equal wages and adequate housing. Land councils are self-supporting, and not funded by state or federal taxes.

The first land councils were created in the Northern Territory under the Aboriginal Land Rights Act 1976, with the states later creating their own legislation and system of land councils. Aboriginal land trusts (ALTs) were also set up under the Act, which hold the freehold title to the land granted under the Act. There are 151 Aboriginal land trusts, holding nearly 50 percent of the land in the NT, which is administered by one of four land councils in the Territory, depending on location. Land councils must ensure that they act on the advice and with the consent of the traditional owners; control over Aboriginal-owned land thus lies with the traditional owners, represented by the land council.

Each state has a different system relating to Aboriginal-owned land, with the representative bodies given varying names. In New South Wales, there is also a network of local Aboriginal land councils (LALCs), which form a network of organisations close to their communities and support the larger land council, but these bodies do not administer land owned freehold by Aboriginal people.

== Background and description ==
The Aboriginal Land Rights Act 1976, a piece of federal government legislation, was the first law by any Australian government that legally recognised the Aboriginal system of land ownership, legislating the concept of inalienable freehold title, and thus the first of all Aboriginal land rights legislation in Australia. Title to the freehold land thus granted is held by Aboriginal land trusts, also created by the Act. While it applied only to the Northern Territory, this law provided the basis on which Aboriginal peoples could claim land rights based on traditional occupation, and it set a precedent which was followed by the other states.

The Land Rights Act also created Aboriginal land trusts (ALTs), which hold the freehold title to the land granted under the Act. Land councils must ensure that they act on the advice and with the consent of the traditional owners; control over Aboriginal-owned land thus lies with the traditional owners, represented by the land councils.

The various state laws "effectively confer collective title to or for the benefit of traditional owners", with rights that frequently enable the pursuit of economic development opportunities for the traditional owners. Land councils are not the same as Registered Native Title Body Corporates (RNTBCs), which are funded by the federal government. Native title in Australia includes rights and interests that relate to land and waters held by Indigenous people under traditional laws and customs, recognised by the common law in accordance with the Native Title Act 1993 (Cth). These bodies (also known as Prescribed Bodies Corporate or PBCs), hold, manage and protect native title on behalf of traditional owners, but do not own land.

The states' land councils (or equivalents) also have responsibilities under the [federal] Native Title Act. Land councils are not funded by state or federal taxes, but finance themselves.

== In the states and territories ==
The Aboriginal Land Rights Act 1976 created the Central Land Council and the Northern Land Council in the Northern Territory; two others (Tiwi Land Council and Anindilyakwa Land Council) were created later. It also created 151 Aboriginal land trusts, holding nearly 50 percent of the land in the NT, which is administered by one of four land councils, depending on location. Under the Act, traditional owners hold decision-making powers over the use of Aboriginal land. Land Councils assist traditional owners to acquire and manage their land. Royalty equivalents for mining activity on Aboriginal land in the Northern Territory are paid to the Aboriginals Benefit Account, administered by the federal government.

In New South Wales, a network of local Aboriginal land councils (LALCs) and a state land council were set up by the Aboriginal Land Rights Act 1983. but these bodies do not administer land owned freehold by Aboriginal people.

In Queensland, there is both Aboriginal and Torres Strait Islander freehold land, governed by the Aboriginal Land Act 1991 (Qld) and the Torres Strait Islander Land Act 1991 (Qld), although this only makes up 5 percent of the land in the state. This type of land is held by either a land trust established under one of the Acts, or a corporation termed a "CATSIA body" (because they are created under the Commonwealth Corporations (Aboriginal and Torres Strait Islander) Act 2006 or "CATSI Act"), which may be a Registered Native Title Body Corporate (RNTBC). Another type of land tenure peculiar to Queensland is the land (mostly former Aboriginal reserves) created under a Deed of Grant in Trust (DOGIT). DOGIT land is held in collective title rather than individual titles; it is held for future generations and cannot be sold. DOGITs are in the process of converting parts of the collective title to freehold title, but only for land in urban areas.

In South Australia, the three Aboriginal landholding authorities are the (South Australian) Aboriginal Lands Trust, Anangu Pitjantjatjara Yankunytjatjara (APY) and Maralinga Tjarutja, all statutory bodies. The ALT was created under the Aboriginal Lands Trust Act 1966, but since 1 July 2014 has been governed by the Aboriginal Lands Trust Act 2013. The South Australian Government provides land rights administration funding to the ALT and works with the Trust on a range of economic, community development and landcare projects across the state. APY was created by the APY Land Rights Act 1981, as amended in 2016–2017, and has an elected Executive Board. The government is also able to transfer other crown land to the control of the Trust.

In Tasmania, ownership of several areas was transferred to a land council, in trust for Aboriginal Tasmanians, via the Aboriginal Lands Act 1995.

In Victoria, various pieces of legislation between 1970 and 1991 transferred specific land to Aboriginal communities. Victorian laws provide for organisations called Registered Aboriginal Parties, which may provide functions in relation to Aboriginal people similar to those provided by land councils. Most of these are also Registered Native Title Body Corporate (RNTBCs).

In Western Australia, the Aborigines Act 1889 allowed Crown lands to be reserved for, but not transferred to, Aboriginal people. The Aboriginal Lands Trust (ALT) was created under the Aboriginal Affairs Planning Authority Act 1972, and as of 2021 has responsibility for about 24,000,000 hectares (59,000,000 acres), the equivalent of around 10% of the state's land. There are many regional and remote communities living on 44 reserves situated on this land, represented by a number of land councils.

== List of land councils by state ==
=== New South Wales ===
- NSW Aboriginal Land Council (oversees 121 local land councils)
- Metropolitan Local Aboriginal Land Council

=== Northern Territory ===
- Central Land Council covering the southern part of mainland Northern Territory
- Northern Land Council covering the Top End, the northern part of mainland Northern Territory
- the Tiwi Land Council covering Tiwi Islands north of Darwin
- the Anindilyakwa Land Council covering Groote Eylandt in the Gulf of Carpentaria.

=== Queensland ===
- North Queensland Land Council
- Central Queensland Land Council
- Torres Strait Regional Authority
- Cape York Land Council

=== South Australia ===
- Anangu Pitjantjatjara Yankunytjatjara
- Maralinga Tjarutja
- South Australian Aboriginal Lands Trust

=== Tasmania ===
- Tasmanian Aboriginal Land and Sea Council

=== Victoria ===
As of July 2019, the 11 Registered Aboriginal Parties (RAPs) cover around 66% of the state. They are:

- Barengi Gadjin Land Council Aboriginal Corporation
- Bunurong Land Council Aboriginal Corporation
- Dja Dja Wurrung Clans Aboriginal Corporation
- Eastern Maar Aboriginal Corporation
- First people of the Millewa Mallee Aboriginal Corporation
- Gunaikurnai Land and Waters Aboriginal Corporation
- Gunditj Mirring Traditional Owners Aboriginal Corporation (GMTOAC)
- Taungurung Land and Waters Council Aboriginal Corporation
- Wathaurung Aboriginal Corporation (trading as Wadawurrung)
- Wurundjeri Woi Wurrung Cultural Heritage Aboriginal Corporation
- Yorta Yorta Nation Aboriginal Corporation (YYNAC)

=== Western Australia ===
- South West Aboriginal Land and Sea Council
- Yamatji Bana Baaba Marlpa Land and Sea Council
- Goldfields Land and Sea Aboriginal Council Corporation
- Kimberley Land Council
- Ngaanyatjarra Council (Aboriginal Corporation)

== See also ==
- Native title in Australia
- Native Title Act 1993
- Office of the Registrar of Indigenous Corporations (ORIC)
- Registered Native Title Body Corporate (RNTBC)
