= Wathaurung Aboriginal Corporation =

Aboriginal Australian co-operative charity

The Wathaurung Aboriginal Corporation, a Registered Aboriginal Party since 21 May 2009, represents the Aboriginal Australian people for the Geelong and Ballarat areas. Their responsibility includes ensuring that the Aboriginal culture is maintained there. The organisation trades as Wadawurrung or Wathaurung.

The Wathaurung Aboriginal Corporation has offices based in Ballarat, and implements responsibilities as a Registered Aboriginal Party under the Aboriginal Heritage Act 2006, although a separate group, the Wathaurong Aboriginal Co-operative, based in Geelong, challenged the decision of the Aboriginal Heritage Council when the appointment was made.

== Staff ==
The Byron Powell was appointed chairperson in 2009.

Sean Fagan has been the Cultural Heritage Coordinator since 2011. Prior to that, Bonnie Fagan (Chew) was Cultural Heritage Coordinator from 2008 to 2011.

== Cultural site mapping ==
Wathaurung Aboriginal Corporation is using an application called CrestSX to map cultural sites, including sites that are significant for events now and back 25,000 years or more, when the Wathaurung people first inhabited the Geelong, Ballarat, and the Bellarine Peninsula. The funding was made available through a grant from the William Buckland Foundation that allowed the Victoria University's Sir Zelman Cowen Centre to work with Iconix to develop a geographic information system. The system will allow the Wathaurung people to map important sites, control the information, and share the information with land managers, such as catchment management authorities and Parks Victoria. Some sites are not self-evident. For instance, a corroboree tree was a meeting place for trading and dances. One red gum tree is one hundred years old and is located in Buninyong in the middle of a busy residential street. Using the software, they are able "to identify the site, [and] track its condition and management by recording its details and taking photos". Oral histories can be gathered to provide detail about a site's significance. The software has won a National Trust of Australia heritage award and an award by the City of Ballarat.

== See also ==
- Aboriginal sites of Victoria
- Victorian Aboriginal Heritage Register
