= Multiregional origin of modern humans =

Human evolution hypothesis

The multiregional hypothesis, multiregional evolution (MRE), or polycentric hypothesis, is a scientific model that provides an alternative explanation to the more widely accepted "Out of Africa" model of monogenesis for the pattern of human evolution.

Multiregional evolution holds that the human species first arose around two million years ago and subsequent human evolution has been within a single, continuous human species. This species encompasses all archaic human forms such as Homo erectus, Denisovans, and Neanderthals as well as modern forms, and evolved worldwide to the diverse populations of anatomically modern humans (Homo sapiens).

The hypothesis contends that the mechanism of clinal variation through a model of "centre and edge" allowed for the necessary balance between genetic drift, gene flow, and selection throughout the Pleistocene, as well as overall evolution as a global species, but while retaining regional differences in certain morphological features. Proponents of multiregionalism point to fossil and genomic data and continuity of archaeological cultures as support for their hypothesis.

The multiregional hypothesis was first proposed in 1984, and then revised in 2003. In its revised form, it is similar to the assimilation model, which holds that modern humans originated in Africa and today share a predominant recent African origin, but have also absorbed small, geographically variable, degrees of admixture from other regional (archaic) hominin species.

The multiregional hypothesis is not currently the most accepted theory of modern human origin among scientists. "The African replacement model has gained the widest acceptance owing mainly to genetic data (particularly mitochondrial DNA) from existing populations. This model is consistent with the realization that modern humans cannot be classified into subspecies or races, and it recognizes that all populations of present-day humans share the same potential." The African replacement model is also known as the "out of Africa" theory, which is currently the most widely accepted model. It proposes that Homo sapiens evolved in Africa before migrating across the world." And: "The primary competing scientific hypothesis is currently recent African origin of modern humans, which proposes that modern humans arose as a new species in Africa around 100-200,000 years ago, moving out of Africa around 50-60,000 years ago to replace existing human species such as Homo erectus and the Neanderthals without interbreeding. This differs from the multiregional hypothesis in that the multiregional model predicts interbreeding with preexisting local human populations in any such migration."

== History ==
Hominin timeline
← / Earlier apes; ← / Gorilla split; ← / Chimpanzee split; ← / Earliest bipedal; ← / Earliest sign of Ardipithecus; ← / Earliest sign of Australopithecus; ← / Earliest stone tools; ← / Earliest sign of Homo; ← / Dispersal beyond Africa; ← / Earliest fire / cooking; ← / Earliest rock art; ← / Earliest clothes; ← / Modern humans
(million years ago)

Life timeline
← / Earth formed; ← / Earliest water; ← / LUCA; ← / Earliest fossils; ← / Great Oxygenation Event; ← / Sexual reproduction; ← / Earliest fungi; ← / Neoproterozoic oxygenation event; ← / Ediacaran biota; ← / Cambrian explosion; ← / Earliest tetrapods; ← / Earliest hominoid
(million years ago)

=== Overview ===
The Multiregional hypothesis was proposed in 1984 by Milford H. Wolpoff, Alan Thorne and Xinzhi Wu. Wolpoff credits Franz Weidenreich's "Polycentric" hypothesis of human origins as a major influence, but cautions that this should not be confused with polygenism, or Carleton Coon's model that minimized gene flow. According to Wolpoff, multiregionalism was misinterpreted by William W. Howells, who confused Weidenreich's hypothesis with a polygenic "candelabra model" in his publications spanning five decades:

How did Multiregional evolution get stigmatized as polygeny? We believe it comes from the confusion of Weidenreich's ideas, and ultimately of our own, with Coon's. The historic reason for linking Coon's and Weidenreich's ideas came from the mischaracterizations of Weidenreich's Polycentric model as a candelabra (Howells, 1942, 1944, 1959, 1993), that made his Polycentric model appear much more similar to Coon's than it actually was.

Through the influence of Howells, many other anthropologists and biologists have confused multiregionalism with polygenism i.e. separate or multiple origins for different populations. Alan Templeton for example notes that this confusion has led to the error that gene flow between different populations was added to the Multiregional hypothesis as a "special pleading in response to recent difficulties", despite the fact: "parallel evolution was never part of the multiregional model, much less its core, whereas gene flow was not a recent addition, but rather was present in the model from the very beginning" (emphasis in original). Despite this, multiregionalism is still confused with polygenism, or Coon's model of racial origins, from which Wolpoff and his colleagues have distanced themselves. Wolpoff has also defended Wiedenreich's Polycentric hypothesis from being labeled polyphyletic. Weidenreich himself in 1949 wrote: "I may run the risk of being misunderstood, namely that I believe in polyphyletic evolution of man".

In 1998, Wu founded a China-specific Multiregional model called "Continuity with [Incidental] Hybridization". Wu's variant only applies the Multiregional hypothesis to the East Asian fossil record, and is popular among Chinese scientists. However, James Leibold, a political historian of modern China, has argued the support for Wu's model is largely rooted in Chinese nationalism. Outside of China, the Multiregional hypothesis has limited support, held only by a small number of paleoanthropologists.

=== "Classic" vs "weak" multiregionalism ===
Chris Stringer, a leading proponent of the more mainstream recent African origin theory, debated Multiregionalists such as Wolpoff and Thorne in a series of publications throughout the late 1980s and 1990s. Stringer describes how he considers the original Multiregional hypothesis to have been modified over time into a weaker variant that now allows a much greater role for Africa in human evolution, including anatomical modernity (and subsequently less regional continuity than was first proposed).

Stringer distinguishes the original or "classic" Multiregional model as having existed from 1984 (its formulation) until 2003, to a "weak" post-2003 variant that has "shifted close to that of the Assimilation Model".

=== Genetic studies ===
The finding that "Mitochondrial Eve" was relatively recent and African seemed to give the upper hand to the proponents of the Out of Africa hypothesis. But in 2002, Alan Templeton published a genetic analysis involving other loci in the genome as well, and this showed that some variants that are present in modern populations existed already in Asia hundreds of thousands of years ago. This meant that even if our male line (Y chromosome) and our female line (mitochondrial DNA) came out of Africa in the last 100,000 years or so, we have inherited other genes from populations that were already outside of Africa. Since this study other studies have been done using much more data (see Phylogeography).

== Fossil evidence ==
=== Morphological clades ===
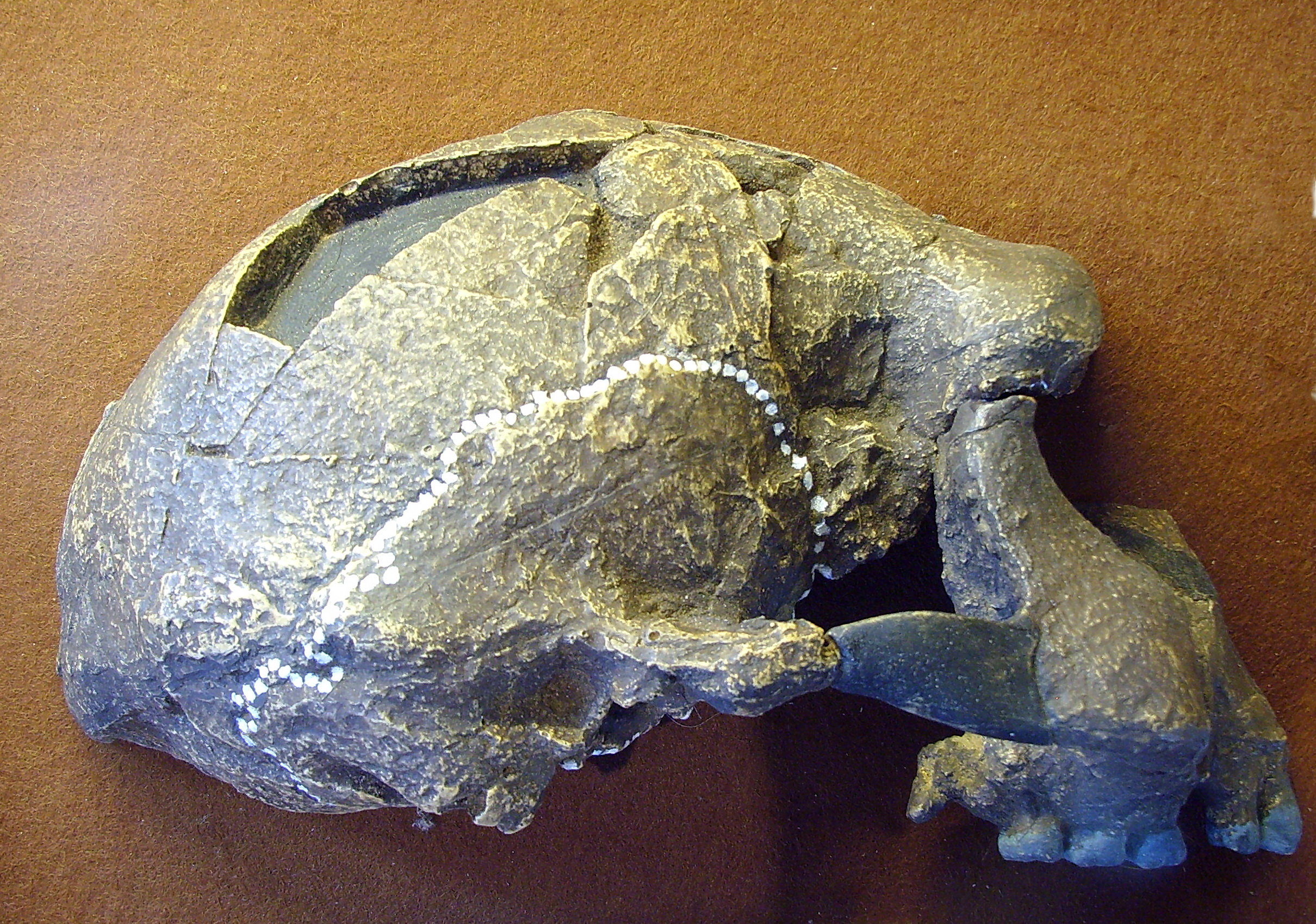
Replica of Sangiran 17 Homo erectus skull from Indonesia showing obtuse face to vault angle determined by fitting of bones at brow.

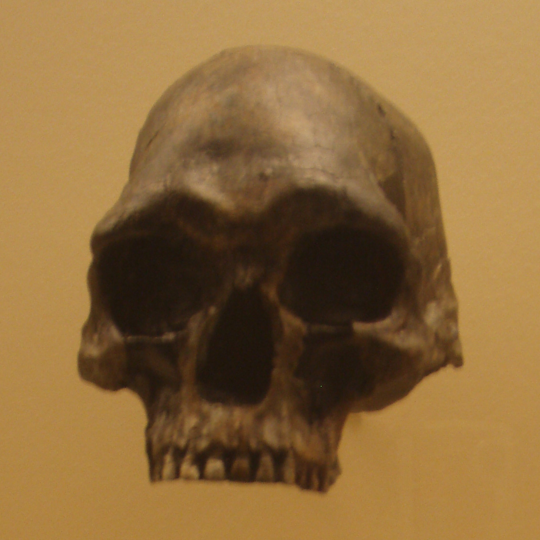
Cast of anatomically modern human Kow Swamp 1 skull from Australia with a face to vault angle matching that of Sangiran 17 (Wolpoff's reconstruction).

Proponents of the multiregional hypothesis see regional continuity of certain morphological traits spanning the Pleistocene in different regions across the globe as evidence against a single replacement model from Africa. In general, three major regions are recognized: Europe, China, and Indonesia (often including Australia). Wolpoff cautions that the continuity in certain skeletal features in these regions should not be seen in a racial context, instead calling them morphological clades; defined as sets of traits that "uniquely characterise a geographic region". According to Wolpoff and Thorne (1981): "We do not regard a morphological clade as a unique lineage, nor do we believe it necessary to imply a particular taxonomic status for it". Critics of multiregionalism have pointed out that no single human trait is unique to a geographical region (i.e. confined to one population and not found in any other) but Wolpoff et al. (2000) note that regional continuity only recognizes combinations of features, not traits if individually accessed, a point they elsewhere compare to the forensic identification of a human skeleton:

Regional continuity ... is not the claim that such features do not appear elsewhere; the genetic structure of the human species makes such a possibility unlikely to the extreme. There may be uniqueness in combinations of traits, but no single trait is likely to have been unique in a particular part of the world although it might appear to be so because of the incomplete sampling provided by the spotty human fossil record.

Combinations of features are "unique" in the sense of being found in only one region, or more weakly limited to one region at high frequency (very rarely in another). Wolpoff stresses that regional continuity works in conjunction with genetic exchanges between populations. Long-term regional continuity in certain morphological traits is explained by Alan Thorne's "centre and edge" population genetics model which resolves Weidenreich's paradox of "how did populations retain geographical distinctions and yet evolve together?". For example, in 2001 Wolpoff and colleagues published an analysis of character traits of the skulls of early modern human fossils in Australia and central Europe. They concluded that the diversity of these recent humans could not "result exclusively from a single late Pleistocene dispersal", and implied dual ancestry for each region, involving interbreeding with Africans.

==== Indonesia, Australia ====
Thorne held that there was regional continuity in Indonesia and Australia for a morphological clade. This sequence is said to consist of the earliest fossils from Sangiran, Java, that can be traced through Ngandong and found in prehistoric and recent Aboriginal Australians. In 1991, Andrew Kramer tested 17 proposed morphological clade features. He found that: "a plurality (eight) of the seventeen non-metric features link Sangiran to modern Australians" and that these "are suggestive of morphological continuity, which implies the presence of a genetic continuum in Australasia dating back at least one million years" but Colin Groves has criticized Kramer's methodology, pointing out that the polarity of characters was not tested and that the study is actually inconclusive. Phillip Habgood discovered that the characters said to be unique to the Australasian region by Thorne are plesiomorphic:

...it is evident that all of the characters proposed... to be 'clade features' linking Indonesian Homo erectus material with Australian Aboriginal crania are retained primitive features present on Homo erectus and archaic Homo sapiens crania in general. Many are also commonly found on the crania and mandibles of anatomically-modern Homo sapiens from other geographical locations, being especially prevalent on the robust Mesolithic skeletal material from North Africa."

Yet, regardless of these criticisms Habgood (2003) allows for limited regional continuity in Indonesia and Australia, recognizing four plesiomorphic features which do not appear in such a unique combination on fossils in any other region: a sagittally flat frontal bone, with a posterior position of minimum frontal breadth, great facial prognathism, and zygomaxillary tuberosities. This combination, Habgood says, has a "certain Australianness about it".

Wolpoff, initially skeptical of Thorne's claims, became convinced when reconstructing the Sangiran 17 Homo erectus skull from Indonesia, when he was surprised that the skull's face to vault angle matched that of the Australian modern human Kow Swamp 1 skull in excessive prognathism. Durband (2007) in contrast states that "features cited as showing continuity between Sangiran 17 and the Kow Swamp sample disappeared in the new, more orthognathic reconstruction of that fossil that was recently completed". Baba et al. who newly restored the face of Sangiran 17 concluded: "regional continuity in Australasia is far less evident than Thorne and Wolpoff argued".

==== China ====
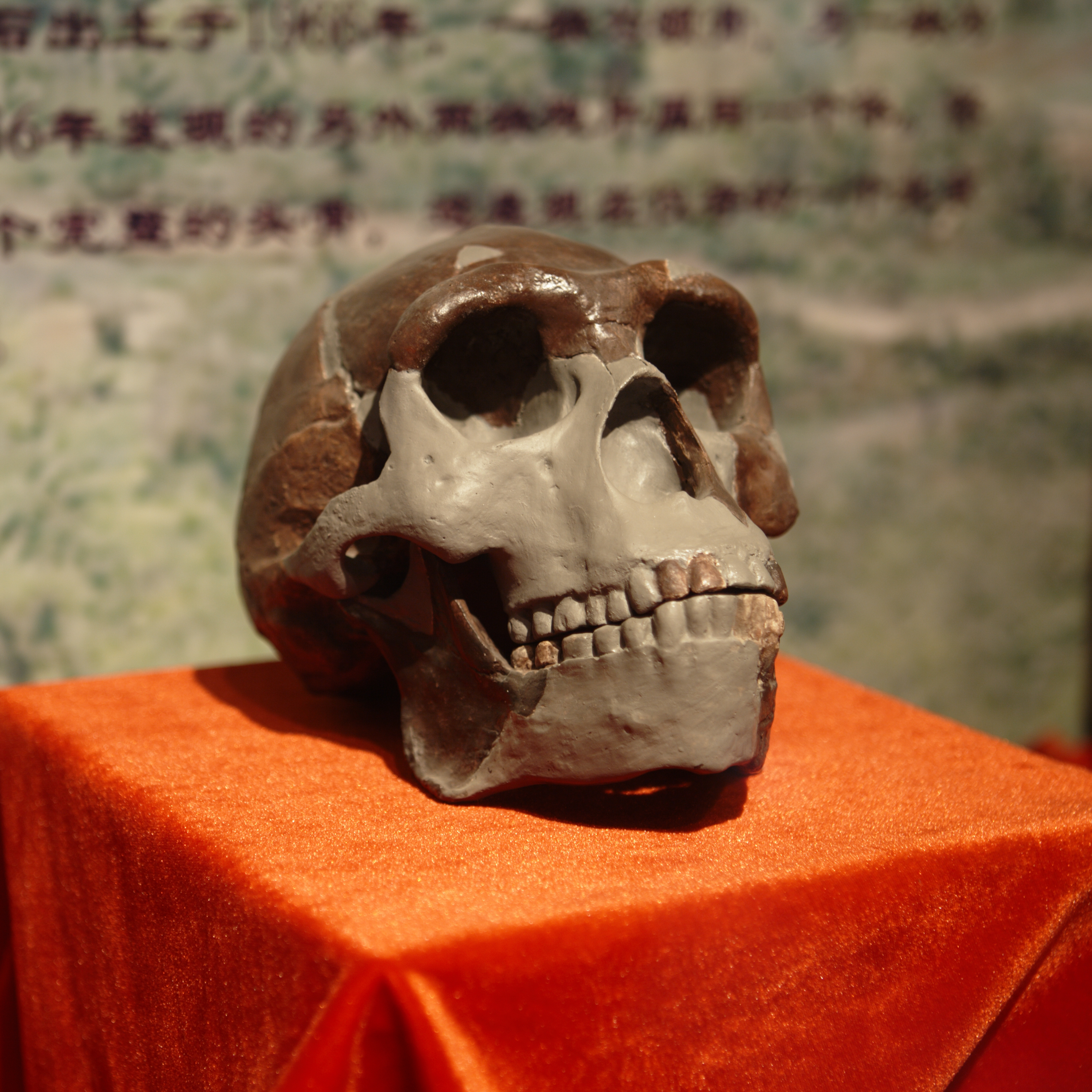
Replica of Homo erectus ("Peking man") skull from China.

Xinzhi Wu has argued for a morphological clade in China spanning the Pleistocene, characterized by a combination of 10 features. The sequence is said to start with Lantian and Peking Man, traced to Dali, to Late Pleistocene specimens (e.g. Liujiang) and recent Chinese. Habgood in 1992 criticized Wu's list, pointing out that most of the 10 features in combination appear regularly on fossils outside China. He did though note that three combined: a non-depressed nasal root, non-projecting perpendicularly oriented nasal bones and facial flatness are unique to the Chinese region in the fossil record and may be evidence for limited regional continuity. However, according to Chris Stringer, Habgood's study suffered from not including enough fossil samples from North Africa, many of which exhibit the small combination he considered to be region-specific to China.

Facial flatness as a morphological clade feature has been rejected by many anthropologists since it is found on many early African Homo erectus fossils, and is therefore considered plesiomorphic, but Wu has responded that the form of facial flatness in the Chinese fossil record appears distinct to other (i.e. primitive) forms. Toetik Koesbardiati in her PhD thesis "On the Relevance of the Regional Continuity Features of the Face in East Asia" also found that a form of facial flatness is unique to China (i.e. only appears there at high frequency, very rarely elsewhere) but cautions that this is the only available evidence for regional continuity: "Only two features appear to show a tendency as suggested by the Multiregional model: flatness at the upper face expressed by an obtuse nasio-frontal angle and flatness at the middle part of the face expressed by an obtuse zygomaxillay angle".

Shovel-shaped incisors are commonly cited as evidence for regional continuity in China. Stringer (1992) however found that shovel-shaped incisors are present on >70% of the early Holocene Wadi Halfa fossil sample from North Africa, and common elsewhere. Frayer, et al. (1993) have criticized Stringer's method of scoring shovel-shaped incisor teeth. They discuss the fact that there are different degrees of "shovelled" e.g. trace (+), semi (++), and marked (+++), but that Stringer misleadingly lumped all these together: "...combining shoveling categories in this manner is biologically meaningless and misleading, as the statistic cannot be validly compared with the very high frequencies for the marked shoveling category reported for East Asians." Palaeoanthropologist Fred H. Smith (2009) also emphasizes that: "It is the pattern of shoveling that identities as an East Asian regional feature, not just the occurrence of shoveling of any sort". Multiregionalists argue that marked (+++) shovel-shaped incisors only appear in China at a high frequency, and have <10% occurrence elsewhere.

==== Europe ====
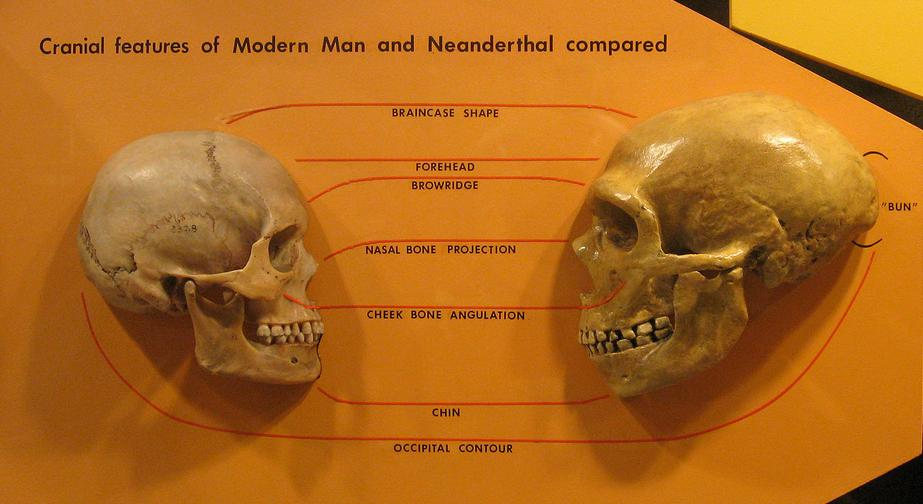
Comparison of modern human (left) and Neanderthal (right) skulls.

Since the early 1990s, David W. Frayer has described what he regards as a morphological clade in Europe. The sequence starts with the earliest dated Neanderthal specimens (Krapina and Saccopastore skulls) traced through the mid-Late Pleistocene (e.g. La Ferrassie 1) to Vindija Cave, and late Upper Palaeolithic Cro-Magnons or recent Europeans. Although many anthropologists consider Neanderthals and Cro Magnons morphologically distinct, Frayer maintains quite the opposite and points to their similarities, which he argues is evidence for regional continuity:

"Contrary to Brauer's recent pronouncement that there is a large and generally recognized morphological gap between the Neanderthals and the early moderns, the actual evidence provided by the extensive fossil record of late Pleistocene Europe shows considerable continuity between Neanderthals and subsequent Europeans."

Frayer et al. (1993) consider there to be at least four features in combination that are unique to the European fossil record: a horizontal-oval shaped mandibular foramen, anterior mastoid tubercle, suprainiac fossa, and narrowing of the nasal breadth associated with tooth-size reduction. Regarding the latter, Frayer observes a sequence of nasal narrowing in Neanderthals, following through to late Upper Palaeolithic and Holocene (Mesolithic) crania. His claims are disputed by others, but have received support from Wolpoff, who regards late Neanderthal specimens to be "transitional" in nasal form between earlier Neanderthals and later Cro Magnons. Based on other cranial similarities, Wolpoff et al. (2004) argue for a sizable Neanderthal contribution to modern Europeans.

More recent claims regarding continuity in skeletal morphology in Europe focus on fossils with both Neanderthal and modern anatomical traits, to provide evidence of interbreeding rather than replacement. Examples include the Lapedo child found in Portugal and the Oase 1 mandible from Peștera cu Oase, Romania, though the "Lapedo child" is disputed by some.

== Genetic evidence ==
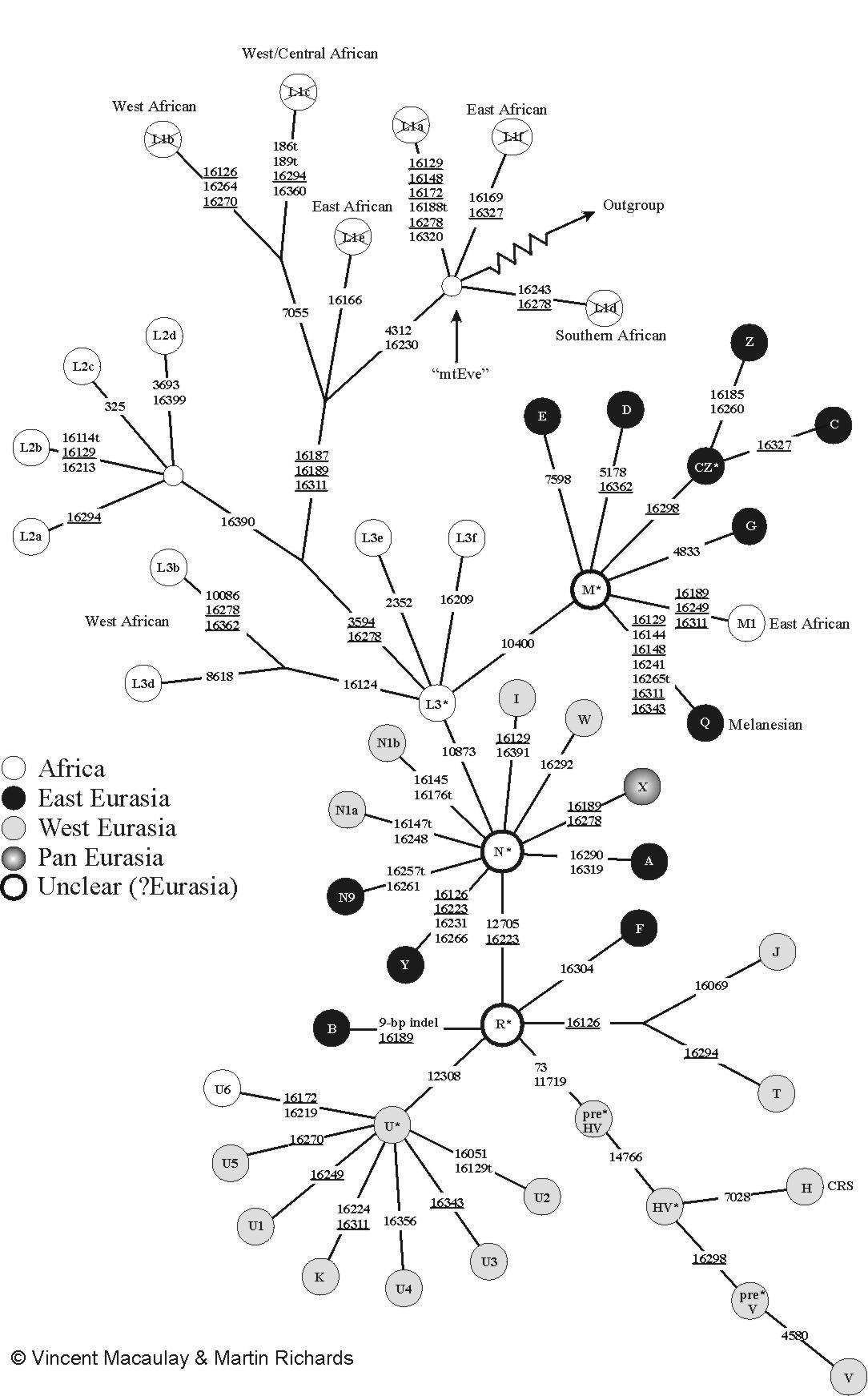
Human mitochondrial DNA tree. "Mitochondrial Eve" is near the top of the diagram, next to the jagged arrow pointing to "Outgroup", and her distance from any nonafrican groups indicates that living human mitochondrial lineages coalesce in Africa.

=== Mitochondrial Eve ===
A 1987 analysis of mitochondrial DNA from 147 people by Cann et al. from around the world indicated that their mitochondrial lineages all coalesced in a common ancestor from Africa between 140,000 and 290,000 years ago. The analysis suggested that this reflected the worldwide expansion of modern humans as a new species, replacing, rather than mixing with, local archaic humans outside of Africa. Such a recent replacement scenario is not compatible with the Multiregional hypothesis and the mtDNA results led to increased popularity for the alternative single replacement theory. According to Wolpoff and colleagues:

When they were first published, the Mitochondrial Eve results were clearly incongruous with Multiregional evolution, and we wondered how the two could be reconciled.

Multiregionalists have responded to what they see as flaws in the Eve theory, and have offered contrary genetic evidences. Wu and Thorne have questioned the reliability of the molecular clock used to date Eve. Multiregionalists point out that Mitochondrial DNA alone can not rule out interbreeding between early modern and archaic humans, since archaic human mitochondrial strains from such interbreeding could have been lost due to genetic drift or a selective sweep. Wolpoff for example states that Eve is "not the most recent common ancestor of all living people" since "Mitochondrial history is not population history".

=== Neanderthal mtDNA ===
Neanderthal mitochondrial DNA (mtDNA) sequences from Feldhofer and Vindija Cave are substantially different from modern human mtDNA. Multiregionalists however have discussed the fact that the average difference between the Feldhofer sequence and living humans is less than that found between chimpanzee subspecies, and therefore that while Neanderthals were different subspecies, they were still human and part of the same lineage.

=== Nuclear DNA ===
Initial analysis of Y chromosome DNA, which like mitochondrial DNA, is inherited from only one parent, was consistent with a recent African replacement model. However, the mitochondrial and Y chromosome data could not be explained by the same modern human expansion out of Africa; the Y chromosome expansion would have involved genetic mixing that retained regionally local mitochondrial lines. In addition, the Y chromosome data indicated a later expansion back into Africa from Asia, demonstrating that gene flow between regions was not unidirectional.

An early analysis of 15 noncoding sites on the X chromosome found additional inconsistencies with the recent African replacement hypothesis. The analysis found a multimodal distribution of coalescence times to the most recent common ancestor for those sites, contrary to the predictions for recent African replacement; in particular, there were more coalescence times near 2 million years ago (mya) than expected, suggesting an ancient population split around the time humans first emerged from Africa as Homo erectus, rather than more recently as suggested by the mitochondrial data. While most of these X chromosome sites showed greater diversity in Africa, consistent with African origins, a few of the sites showed greater diversity in Asia rather than Africa. For four of the 15 gene sites that did show greater diversity in Africa, the sites' varying diversity by region could not be explained by simple expansion from Africa, as would be required by the recent African replacement hypothesis.

Later analyses of X chromosome and autosomal DNA continued to find sites with deep coalescence times inconsistent with a single origin of modern humans, diversity patterns inconsistent with a recent expansion from Africa, or both. For example, analyses of a region of RRM2P4 (ribonucleotide reductase M2 subunit pseudogene 4) showed a coalescence time of about 2 Mya, with a clear root in Asia, while the MAPT locus at 17q21.31 is split into two deep genetic lineages, one of which is common in and largely confined to the present European population, suggesting inheritance from Neanderthals. In the case of the Microcephalin D allele, evidence for rapid recent expansion indicated introgression from an archaic population. However, later analysis, including of the genomes of Neanderthals, did not find the Microcephalin D allele (in the proposed archaic species), nor evidence that it had introgressed from an archaic lineage as previously suggested.

In 2001, a DNA study of more than 12,000 men from 163 East Asian regions showed that all of them carry a mutation that originated in Africa about 35,000 to 89,000 years ago and these "data do not support even a minimal in situ hominid contribution in the origin of anatomically modern humans in East Asia".

In a 2005 review and analysis of the genetic lineages of 25 chromosomal regions, Alan Templeton found evidence of more than 34 occurrences of gene flow between Africa and Eurasia. Of these occurrences, 19 were associated with continuous restricted gene exchange through at least 1.46 million years ago; only 5 were associated with a recent expansion from Africa to Eurasia. Three were associated with the original expansion of Homo erectus out of Africa around 2 million years ago, 7 with an intermediate expansion out of Africa at a date consistent with the expansion of Acheulean tool technology, and a few others with other gene flows such as an expansion out of Eurasia and back into Africa subsequent to the most recent expansion out of Africa. Templeton rejected a hypothesis of complete recent African replacement with greater than 99% certainty (p < 10^{−17}).

=== Ancient DNA ===
Recent analyses of DNA taken directly from Neanderthal specimens indicates that they or their ancestors contributed to the genome of all humans outside of Africa, indicating there was some degree of interbreeding with Neanderthals before their replacement. It has also been shown that Denisova hominins contributed to the DNA of Melanesians and Australians through interbreeding.

By 2006, extraction of DNA directly from some archaic human samples was becoming possible. The earliest analyses were of Neanderthal DNA, and indicated that the Neanderthal contribution to modern human genetic diversity was no more than 20%, with a most likely value of 0%. By 2010, however, detailed DNA sequencing of the Neanderthal specimens from Europe indicated that the contribution was nonzero, with Neanderthals sharing 1-4% more genetic variants with living non-Africans than with living humans in sub-Saharan Africa. In late 2010, a recently discovered non-Neanderthal archaic human, the Denisova hominin from south-western Siberia, was found to share 4–6% more of its genome with living Melanesian humans than with any other living group, supporting admixture between two regions outside of Africa. In August 2011, human leukocyte antigen (HLA) alleles from the archaic Denisovan and Neanderthal genomes were found to show patterns in the modern human population demonstrating origins from these non-African populations; the ancestry from these archaic alleles at the HLA-A site was more than 50% for modern Europeans, 70% for Asians, and 95% for Papua New Guineans. Proponents of the multiregional hypothesis believe the combination of regional continuity inside and outside of Africa and lateral gene transfer between various regions around the world supports the multiregional hypothesis. However, "Out of Africa" Theory proponents also explain this with the fact that genetic changes occur on a regional basis rather than a continental basis, and populations close to each other are likely to share certain specific regional SNPs while sharing most other genes in common. Migration Matrix theory (A=Mt) indicates that dependent upon the potential contribution of Neanderthal ancestry, we would be able to calculate the percentage of Neanderthal mtDNA contribution to the human species. As we do not know the specific migration matrix, we are unable to input the exact data, which would answer these questions irrefutably.

== See also ==
- Human evolution
- Human origins
- Interbreeding between archaic and modern humans
- Mitochondrial Eve
- Phyletic gradualism
- Recent African origin of modern humans
- Y-chromosomal Adam
