= Bunurong Land Council Aboriginal Corporation =

Australian Aboriginal Corporation in Victoria

The Bunurong Land Council Aboriginal Corporation is a Registered Aboriginal Party and incorporated association representing the Bunurong (Boon wurrung) community in the state of Victoria, Australia, particularly in matters relating to the Victorian Aboriginal Heritage Act 2006.

The corporation provides cultural heritage and environmental land management advice and is the approval body for Cultural Heritage Management Plans on Bunorong land. It is also often consulted by schools to provide culturally appropriate advice for lessons. The Bunurong Land Council cultural policy area encapsulates Bunurong traditional lands, waters and cosmos commencing from the Werribee River east around Port Phillip Bay, Mornington Peninsula, Western Port and South Gippsland coastline to Wilson's Promontory. Inland Bunurong boundaries are the watersheds that flow into Port Phillip, Western Port and Bass coastline.

In June 2021, the boundaries between the land of two of the traditional owner groups in greater Melbourne, the Wurundjeri and Boon wurrung/Bunurong, were agreed between the two groups, after being drawn up by the Victorian Aboriginal Heritage Council. The new borderline runs across the city from west to east, with the CBD, Richmond and Hawthorn included in Wurundjeri land, and Albert Park, St Kilda and Caulfield on Bunurong land. It was agreed that Mount Cottrell, the site of a massacre in 1836 with at least 10 Wathaurong victims, would be jointly managed above the 160 m (520 ft) line. The two Registered Aboriginal Parties representing the two groups were the Bunurong Land Council Aboriginal Corporation and the Wurundjeri Woi Wurrung Cultural Heritage Aboriginal Corporation. The change means that the corporation will be responsible for a much greater area of land, which also includes heritage objects which may be found underneath the city when excavations are undertaken for new buildings.

As of June 2021, Dan Turnbull is CEO of the corporation, while the Cultural Heritage Manager is Rob Ogden. The organisation is based in Frankston.

== See also ==
- Aboriginal sites of Victoria
- Victorian Aboriginal Heritage Register
