= Registered Native Title Body Corporate =

Native Australian rights registration

A Registered Native Title Body Corporate (RNTBC) is a corporation nominated by a group of Aboriginal or Torres Strait Islander people for the purposes of native title in Australia, to represent their native title rights and interests, once that group's native title application has been recognised in a Federal Court of Australia determination, and the corporate body registered. The corporation nominated hold and manage (as trustee) or manage (as agent) before native title determination and registration, is called a Prescribed Body Corporate (PBC).

In 2015, there were 144 RNTBCs registered with the Office of the Registrar of Indigenous Corporations (ORIC). PBCs are required to register with ORIC, under the provisions of the Native Title Act 1993. They must have the words "registered native title body corporate" or "RNTBC" in their name, while other Aboriginal and Torres Strait Islander corporations can choose to register under other state or territory associations law, or under the Corporations Act 2001 (Cth).

== Description ==
A Registered Native Title Body Corporate represents an Indigenous Australian group's native title rights and interests, after these have been recognised by the Federal Court and the body is registered. Before the court determination and registration of the body, it is known as a Prescribed Body Corporate.

Once both the native title determination has been made and the court has determined that the nominated corporation is to be the PBC, it is registered by the National Native Title Tribunal (NNTT) as required by the Native Title Act 1993, and becomes known as a Registered Native Title Body Corporate (RNTBC) (ss 193(2)(e) and 253 NTA). It is at this point that their statutory obligations under the NTA and the Native Title (Prescribed Bodies Corporate) Regulations 1999 are triggered.

PBCs have prescribed characteristics under the Native Title Act 1993 (NTA), including that they are incorporated under the Corporations (Aboriginal and Torres Strait Islander) Act 2006 ("CATSI Act").

In some instances, native title claim groups will create a new organisation whose sole purpose is to act as an RNTBC. Alternatively, they may nominate an existing corporation to become the RNTBC as long as it is already incorporated under the CATSI Act and complies with the provisions of the NTA. Importantly, it must have, among its purposes, the purpose of becoming an RNTBC. Where native title groups have received financial settlements, RNTBCs may become part of a corporate structure which can include charitable trusts, companies, and other Aboriginal and Torres Strait Islander corporations, each of which may perform different or similar functions to achieve the objectives of the native title group and some of which may be incorporated under the Commonwealth Corporations Act 2001, which applies to the broader Australian community.

The kind of bodies that can be determined as PBCs (and therefore registered as RNTBCs) and their functions are set out in the Native Title Act 1993 and Native Title (Prescribed Bodies Corporate) Regulations 1999.

As of 2015, there were 144 RNTBCs registered with ORIC, compared with 9 in 2000. There are many more native title claims than RNTBCs, as the same RNTBC may undertake any number of claims. There directors of the corporations were about 56.1 percent male and 43.9 percent female, and 29 RNTBCs appeared in the top 500 corporations in the 2014–15 financial year.

== Other types of Indigenous bodies ==
Some Aboriginal and Torres Strait Islander corporations are not RNTBCs (often referred to as "native title corporations" or "traditional owner corporations"), but may have generated native title outcomes without having a native title determination. This can occur in different ways, including under other legislation, such as the Victorian Traditional Owner Settlement Act 2010, through native title settlements such as the comprehensive South-West Native Title Settlement for Noongar people in Western Australia, and through native title claimant groups entering into Indigenous land use agreements (ILUAs).

There is a network of native title representative bodies (NTRBs) and native title service providers (NTSPs) to assist native title claimants and holders, of which the National Indigenous Australians Agency (NIAA) funds 14. These include land councils and RNTBCs. A "representative Aboriginal/Torres Strait Islander body", or RATSIB, is a body recognised by the Commonwealth under s 203AD of the Native Title Act "to represent native title holders and persons who may hold native title, and to consult with Aboriginal and Torres Strait Islander persons within a specified area".

== Statutory requirements ==
Statutory differences between PBCs and other corporations, under the Native Title Act (NTA):

- RNTBCs and PBCs are special types of Aboriginal and Torres Strait Islander corporations because they are created especially for common law native title holders to hold or manage native title.
- PBCs must have the words "registered native title body corporate" or "RNTBC" in their name, and must be registered with the Office of the Registrar of Indigenous Corporations (ORIC) as required by the Native Title Act (NTA), while other Aboriginal and Torres Strait Islander corporations can choose to register under other state or territory associations law or under the Corporations Act 2001 (Cth).
- PBCs have obligations under the NTA such as the requirement to consult with and obtain consent from native title holders in relation to any decisions which surrender or affect native title rights and interests.
- If an Aboriginal and Torres Strait Islander corporation becomes or ceases to be a PBC (RNTBC), it must notify ORIC within 28 days.
- PBC directors and officers are protected from a range of criminal and civil penalties for breach of duties as long as they have acted in good faith in complying with obligations under native title legislation (excluding the duty to not trade while insolvent).
- PBCs are not required to value their native title rights and interests as part of their assets, for the purpose of determining their size classification under CATSI.
- PBCs must ensure that their constitution is consistent with native title legislation.
- ORIC must not change the PBC’s constitution on the basis of an act done in good faith and with the belief that the corporation or its officers are complying with native title legislation.
- ORIC is not able to de-register a PBC as long as it remains a PBC and manages or holds native title interests.

== See also ==
- Aboriginal title
- Native title in Australia
- Registered Aboriginal Party, bodies which protect and manage the Aboriginal cultural heritage in Victoria
