= National Native Title Tribunal =

Independent body administering native title in Australia

The National Native Title Tribunal (NNTT) is an independent body established under the Native Title Act 1993 in Australia as a special measure for the advancement and protection of Aboriginal and Torres Strait Islander peoples (Indigenous Australians). It manages applications for and administration of native title in Australia.

== Description ==
The National Native Title Tribunal comprises a President and Members appointed by the Governor-General of Australia under the Act to make decisions, conduct inquiries, reviews and mediations, and assist various parties with native title applications in Australia, and Indigenous land use agreements (ILUAs).

The NNTT is supported by the Native Title Registrar, also appointed by the Governor-General. The statutory office-holders of the Tribunal each have separate and specific functions and responsibilities to perform under the Act.

It is a Commonwealth Government agency, which helps people reach native title outcomes by agreement. The Federal Court of Australia makes determinations on whether native title exists, or not. Since July 2012 the Federal Court has had responsibility for the corporate administration of the NNTT. The President and Members of the Tribunal, assisted by the Registrar, under delegation from the Registrar of the Federal Court of Australia (the Court) are responsible for managing the administrative affairs of the NNTT.

=== Organisational structure ===
The President is responsible for managing the Tribunal's administrative affairs. The Governor-General appoints the President and Tribunal Members for specific terms of not longer than five years. Members are involved in:

- providing assistance and information
- helping people to understand native title and its processes
- Indigenous land use agreement negotiations and future act hearings and processes.

The Registrar has specific responsibilities under the Native Title Act 1993 and is responsible for the management of employees.

== Role and functions ==
The Tribunal's role is to:

- Assist parties to come to agreements over some proposed activities or developments, called future acts, and makes arbitral decisions about these matters.
- Apply the registration test to all new native title claimant applications. All new claims must satisfy this set of conditions to be given certain procedural rights over the area claimed.
- Notify the public when native title applications have been registered. Notification involves placing advertisements in newspapers as well as sending letters directly to people and organisations with a registered interest in the specific area.
- Maintain three registers which hold detailed information about native title in Australia: the Register of Native Title Claims, the National Native Title Register and the Register of Indigenous Land Use Agreements.
- Negotiate other types of agreements, such as Indigenous Land Use Agreements.

On request, the Tribunal can also provide assistance and information to people involved in the native title process.

== Locations ==
The Tribunal has offices in Perth, Cairns, Brisbane, Sydney and Melbourne.

== PBCs, RNTBCs, RATSIBs, NTRBs and NTSPs ==
When an Aboriginal or Torres Strait Islander body registers a claim with the NNTT, they are referred to as a prescribed body corporate (PBC) until such time as a determination is made, when they become a Registered Native Title Body Corporate, or RNTBC, registered with the Office of the Registrar of Indigenous Corporations (ORIC) under the Corporations (Aboriginal and Torres Strait Islander) Act 2006 (Cwth).

A "representative Aboriginal/Torres Strait Islander body", or RATSIB, is a body recognised by the Commonwealth under s 203AD of the Native Title Act "to represent native title holders and persons who may hold native title, and to consult with Aboriginal and Torres Strait Islander persons within a specified area". There is a network of native title representative bodies (NTRBs) and native title service providers (NTSPs) to assist native title claimants and holders, of which the National Indigenous Australians Agency (NIAA) funds 14. These include land councils and RNTBCs.

== See also ==
- Native title in Australia
- Aboriginal title
