= Alan Thorne =

Australian academic (1939–2012)

Alan Gordon Thorne (1 March 1939 – 21 May 2012) was an Australian born anatomist who is considered an authority on interpretations of Aboriginal Australian origins and the human genome. Thorne first became interested in archaeology and human evolution as a lecturer in human anatomy at the University of Sydney and later joined the Australian National University (ANU) as a professor, where he taught biology and human anatomy. Over time, through many excavations such as Lake Mungo and Kow Swamp, Thorne made arguments that contradict traditionally accepted theories explaining the early dispersion of human beings.

== Personal life ==
Alan had two children Rachel Thorne and Nicholas Thorne with his wife Judy.

== Career ==
Thorne worked as a journalist before he emerged on the university campus as a lecturer and then later as a prominent academic figure. Anthropologist Neil Macintosh was a mentor for Thorne, and Thorne eventually earned his PhD under Macintosh at the University of Sydney. Thorne subsequently embraced the work and ideas of Macintosh, who died in 1977, throughout his own career. Thorne held positions with many organisations, such as the Myanmar-Australian Archaeology Project and the Australian Academy of the Humanities, and served as an executive committee member for the International Association for the Study of Human Paleontology. Thorne was also known for making a large number of documentary films that have touched on various anthropological topics, such as the film series, Man on the Rim. He was elected a Fellow of the Australian Academy of the Humanities in 1994.

== Lake Mungo ==
In 1969, whilst teaching at the University of Sydney, Alan Thorne reconstructed the remains of LM1 (also known as "Mungo Lady") and LM3 (also known as "Mungo Man") in 1974. He is also accredited for reconstructing fossil WLH-50 in 1982. Though Jim Bowler has been credited with the discovery of both LM1 and LM3, Thorne performed the reconstruction and analysis of the individual fossil sets. Through the initial reconstruction of "Mungo Lady", Thorne found the bones to be thin and frail, very similar to the bones found in human beings today. The skull thickness of the "Mungo Lady" set, in particular, proved to be the most significant contradiction, as other uncovered Australian hominid specimens dated to approximately the same time period (about 25,000 years ago) have been tall and thick-skulled. Upon realising this contradiction, Thorne began to examine the possibility of new theories to address the fundamental question of "where did Homo sapiens come from?".

Thorne's discovery and reconstruction of "Mungo Lady" led him to question the validity of the "Out of Africa" theory commonly held by many anthropologists. His specimen contained an advanced skull and overall anatomy that resembled modern day humans, but originated during an era and in a location where such hominids were believed not to exist. As a result of what had been uncovered at Lake Mungo, Thorne devoted a large amount of time and energy into constructing a theory that would prove that there had been only one human migration out of Africa and sought support from colleagues in various parts of the world. The single migration, which could have taken place around two million years ago, would have involved Homo sapiens, rather than the Homo erectus species posited by his opponents. When speaking publicly on the matter, Thorne conveyed confidence in his new discovery, stating that "only one species of human has ever left Africa, and that is us."

For Thorne, the Lake Mungo study clearly demonstrated that instead of a second wave of Homo sapiens migration taking place approximately 100,000 to 120,000 years ago out of Africa, "regional continuity" occurred. Thorne believed that the second migration never happened and that the first wave of migration from Africa two million years ago is the basis of human evolution.

== Kow Swamp ==
Thorne played an influential role in the leading of the excavations at the Kow Swamp burial ground, 10 kilometres (6.2 mi) southeast of Cohuna in the central Murray Valley, Australia. Between 1968 and 1972, Thorne, together with colleagues, unearthed 22 individual sets of remains, with a portion dating back to the Pleistocene era. The excavations at Kow Swamp formed part of Thorne's PhD research and he is credited with providing Australian anthropology with the first ever fossil sets from established contexts – that is, from provenance and dating. Through the reconstruction of the individual specimens excavated, Thorne and his team were able to further examine the many features that characterised the time period. The Kow Swamp research provided great insight into the potential appearance of Australia's ancestors, in addition to the variety of lifestyles adopted. Furthermore, this work was combined with the many other excavations being undertaken in Australia and Asia during a similar time period that were exploring the possibility of multiregional human evolution, rather than the widely accepted "Out of Africa" theory.

Studies performed on the Kow Swamp fossils led to the formulation of an alternate theory, as the bodies that were reconstructed proved to be structurally similar to modern humans, rather than the temporal era that was assigned to them. Thorne, alongside similarly minded colleagues, insisted that the predominant theory was flawed.

== Regional continuity theory ==
The theory of "regional continuity" has been significant in the anthropological realm for several decades and has been explored by many researchers in various fields, as they have attempted to respond to the fundamental question of how humans have evolved. Of particular importance to the verification of the theory is the resultant questioning of the fundamental knowledge that humans hold about their own anatomy. Thorne, together with colleagues around the world, called "regional continuity" the more likely path of human history.

The details of the theory contend that around two million years ago, Homo sapiens (not Homo erectus) left Africa and dispersed across the Middle East, into Europe, North and South America and Asia, right down through to Australia. It was thus argued by Thorne that all humans have originated from this initial, single journey. The theory then explains that the sub-species of the hominids (Homo erectus and Homo antecessor) are the basis for the different human physical attributes of the modern age, such as tall, slender southern traits and short, stocky northern characteristics. Fundamental to this argument is the ability of such hominids to sexually reproduce with a member of the opposite sex from any of the different hominid races (Thorne used learnings from his own extensive animal studies as substantiation here). As time progressed, this behaviour is likely to have migrated outwards and further reproduction with different hominids has, according to Thorne's theory, created the races found today.

== Death ==
Thorne died in Canberra on 21 May 2012 of Alzheimer's disease. He was 73.
