= Bend Road archaeological site =

Coordinates: 38°00′15″S 145°11′25″E

The Bend Road archaeological site is an open site in Melbourne, Australia. It was discovered during survey and archaeological testing for the proposed Scoresby Freeway, which eventually became EastLink. The site is located in two separate areas on either side of Bend Road, Dandenong South (Bend Road 1 to the north, Bend Road 2 to the south) where the freeway now intersects the former road, and originally covered about 12 hectares.

== Excavation ==
Extensive excavations by La Trobe University led by Jim Allen in 2006, determined that while bioturbation and large-scale aeolian deflation had caused disturbance to the site, the remains of thousands of stone artefacts could still reveal significant archaeological information.

The site was formed on a sand sheet on a tongue of land beside Dandenong Creek and at the northern edge of Carrum Carrum Swamp and so would have provided a dry area adjacent to rich hunting grounds, with birds, fish, and aquatic plants and animals in abundance.

The excavation showed that the late Holocene period was represented by backed artefacts revealing hundreds of asymmetric points and geometric microlith forms, while an earlier sequence extends back to 30–35,000 BP, suggesting that Bend Road is amongst the oldest known Aboriginal archaeological sites in Victoria. However, some of these results have been disputed.

== See also ==
- Aboriginal sites of Victoria
- Keilor archaeological site
- Kow Swamp Archaeological Site
