= Wurundjeri Woi Wurrung Cultural Heritage Aboriginal Corporation =

Registered Aboriginal Party representing the Wurundjeri people in Victoria, Australia

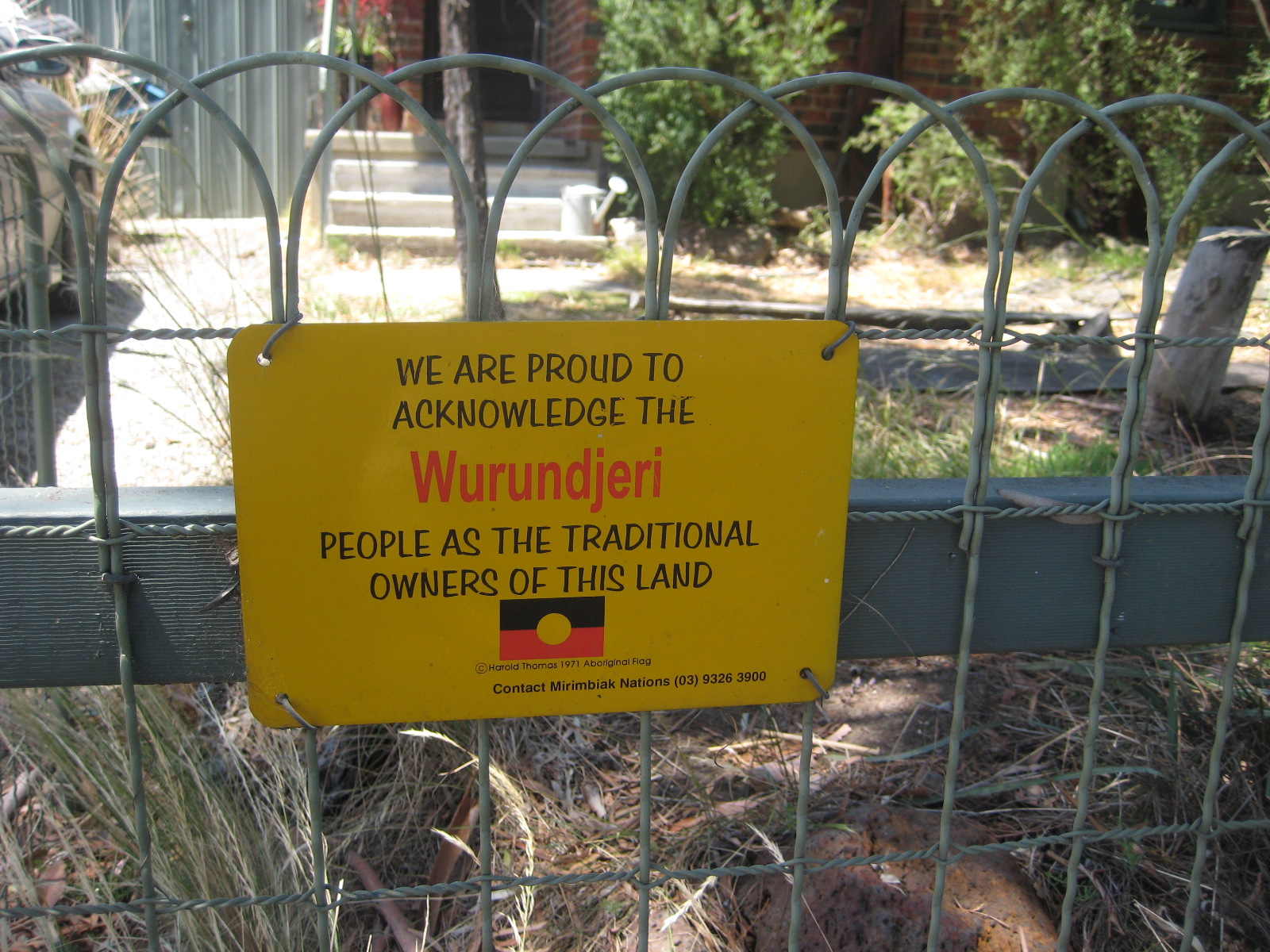
Sign acknowledging Aboriginal Custodians of the land

The Wurundjeri Woi Wurrung Cultural Heritage Aboriginal Corporation, previously the Wurundjeri Tribe Land and Compensation Cultural Heritage Council, is a Registered Aboriginal Party representing the Wurundjeri people, an Aboriginal Australian people of Victoria.

== History ==
The Wurundjeri Tribe Land and Compensation Cultural Heritage Council was established in 1985 by descendants of the Wurundjeri people, who are the traditional custodians of the country around Melbourne. There were three family groups represented in the council: the Nevins, Terricks and Wandins, which included 30 elders and about 60 members. The members of the council (later Corporation) are all descendants of a Woiwurrung / Wurundjeri man named Bebejan, through his daughter Annie Borate (Boorat), and in turn, her son Robert Wandin (Wandoon). Bebejan was a Ngurungaeta of the Wurundjeri people and was present at John Batman's "treaty" signing in 1835.

In 2003 questions were raised over claims of missing funds, after the organisation had not complied with its obligations to hold annual general meetings and lodge annual statements. Wurundjeri Land Council revenue was at that time predominantly from rental of buildings on the 38-hectare (94-acre) former Army School of Health site in Healesville and fees paid by developers for cultural site monitoring, to obtain approval for work on culturally sensitive areas.

The council had a statutory role under Commonwealth legislation that gave it the power to grant or refuse consent to disturb Aboriginal sites. This gave the Council members a significant say in how their important cultural places were managed. In 2006 the Victorian state government introduced the Aboriginal Heritage Act 2006, under which the council became approved as a Registered Aboriginal Party, which allows the council to continue to make decisions about its cultural places. However the decision recognised only the area not under dispute with other parties.

== Roles ==
The corporation has a number of different roles:

- to raise awareness of Wurundjeri culture and history within the wider community.
- actively managing archaeological sites and sites of cultural significance
- benefiting the lives of present-day Wurundjeri people and families.
- Welcome to Country ceremonies that can include speaking in language, traditional dancing, gum leaf and smoking rituals.

The Victorian Government has granted land of cultural significance for the Land Council to manage. These sites include:

- the Sunbury earth rings, an important ceremonial place
- Coranderrk Aboriginal Station Cemetery in Healesville (1991)

== Territorial disputes ==
Boundary disputes have existed among a number of parties, including the Wathaurong people to the west, the Dja Dja Wurrung to the north-west, the Taungurong people to the north, the Gunai/Kurnai to the east and the Boon wurrung/Bunurong people to the south. The dispute over territorial boundaries continued to be challenged even after being set down in 1984 legislation.

In June 2021, the boundaries between the land of two of the traditional owner groups in greater Melbourne, the Wurundjeri and Boonwurrung, were agreed between the two groups, after being drawn up by the Victorian Aboriginal Heritage Council. The new borderline runs across the city from west to east, with the CBD, Richmond and Hawthorn included in Wurundjeri land, and Albert Park, St Kilda and Caulfield on Bunurong land. It was agreed that Mount Cottrell, the site of a massacre in 1836 with at least 10 Wathaurong victims, would be jointly managed above the 160 m (520 ft) line. The two Registered Aboriginal Parties representing the groups were the Bunurong Land Council Aboriginal Corporation and the Wurundjeri Woi Wurrung Cultural Heritage Aboriginal Corporation.

== Office location ==
In 2007 the Land Council opened an office at the refurbished Abbotsford Convent to engage with members of the wider community and provide community space for members. The site is on the Yarra River Dreaming Trail, an important part of the bigger creation story of the Wurundjeri people and their country. There are important Wurundjeri camping sites located nearby which have been used for thousands of years. A little way north is the confluence of the Merri Creek and Yarra River near Dights Falls; the burial site of Billibellary; the location of the Aboriginal Protectorate, Native Police Corps headquarters and Merri Creek Aboriginal School.
