= Human evolution (disambiguation) =

Human evolution is the biological process that led to the emergence of the species Homo sapiens (binomial nomenclature for the human species).

Human evolution may also refer to:

- Descent of Man, an 1871 book by Charles Darwin about human evolution
- Behavioral modernity, transition of human species to anthropologically modern behavior

== See also ==
- Human origins (disambiguation)
- List of human evolution fossils
- Rejection of evolution by religious groups
- The Evolution of Man, a 2012 album by recording artist Example
