= Human origins =

Human origins may refer to:

- Human evolution, evolutionary process leading to anatomically modern humans
- Monogenism, a theory of human origins positing a common descent for all humans, debated in the 19th-century, gave way to
  - Recent African origin of modern humans, the widely accepted theory of humans evolving in Africa then radiating globally
- Polygenism, an obsolete theory of human origin
- Multiregional origin of modern humans, a theory of humans evolving in multiple different places

== See also ==
- Human evolution (disambiguation)
- Creation myth, a mythological narrative of human origins
