= Box Gully archaeological site =

Archaeological site in Victoria, Australia

Coordinates: 35°13′40″S 142°51′12″E

The Box Gully archaeological site is an Aboriginal archaeological site on the shore of saline Lake Tyrrell, in the Mallee region of northern Victoria, Australia. The site consists of the remains of a small hunting camp, which has produced radiocarbon dates of between 26,600 and 32,000 years BP, making Box Gully one of the earliest known occupied sites of the region and the first documentation of pre-30,000 calBP Aboriginal occupation of the extensive area between the Murray River and the Tasmanian highlands.

Located on the north western tip of the Lake Tyrrell lunette along an eroded water channel, the site has revealed hearth features, stone chipping debris, and butchered faunal remains of a variety of animals, including bettong, hare-wallaby, shingle-backed lizard, emu, and freshwater mussel. The site was probably a short term, late autumn-winter camp site, occupied seasonally over multiple occupations.

Lake Tyrrell is the largest playa in the Murray Basin of southeast Australia. Optical dating of sediments within the transverse dune (lunette) sediments demonstrate aspects of the lakes history into the interglacial period, and show the highest lake level around 131,000 ± 10,000 yr ago, forming Lake Chillingollah, a megalake filled by increased winter rainfall, that persisted until around 77,000 ± 4000 yr ago.

The remains of repeated small scale camping episodes were uncovered during excavation in the clay lunette. Five new radiocarbon dates on charcoal were obtained from the layers containing cultural material, and ranged between ca. 32,000 calBP near the bottom and ca. 26,600 calBP near the top of the deposit. These dates were supported by both conventional radiocarbon and Optically Stimulated Luminescence dates, which were obtained independently during geomorphic investigations of Box Gully. Evidence of climatic conditions and human activity at the site suggest that people at Box Gully were adapting to severe climatic stress leading up to the Last Glacial Maximum. As conditions deteriorated further after ca. 27,000 calBP, areas such as the Willandra Lakes, Lake Tandou and the Lower Darling were much less heavily frequented than previously, and at Lake Tyrrell, the site was completely abandoned. Around the same time it appears that more sustained occupation was occurring in the Murray River valley while rockshelters in the highlands of southern Victoria were becoming frequented for the first time.

== See also ==
- Lake Mungo remains
- Kow Swamp Archaeological Site
