= Ghow Swamp =

Reservoir, former wetland, in Victoria, Australia

Torrumbarry Weir
- Location of the reservoir in Victoria
- Interactive map of Torrumbarry Weir
- Country: Australia
- Location: Mallee, North Central Victoria
- Coordinates: 35°57′34″S 144°17′44″E
- Purpose: Irrigation
- Status: Operational
- Opening date: 1923
- Operator: Goulburn–Murray Water

Dam and spillways
- Type of dam: Weir; Swamp / wetland (former)
- Impounds: Off-stream

Reservoir
- Creates: Ghow Swamp; Kow Swamp (former)
- Total capacity: 51,730 ML (41,940 acre⋅ft)
- Active capacity: 50,910 ML (41,270 acre⋅ft)
- Surface area: 2,400 ha (5,900 acres)
- Maximum length: 7 km (4.3 mi)
- Maximum width: 4 km (2.5 mi)
- Maximum water depth: 3 m (9.8 ft)
- Normal elevation: 85 m (279 ft) AHD
- Website g-mwater.com.au

The Ghow Swamp, formerly called the Kow Swamp, is a reservoir formed by the Torrumbarry Weir, a weir fed by off-stream sources, in the Mallee region in north-central Victoria, Australia. Originally a swamp and wetland, the weir was completed in 1923 and the reservoir provides water for irrigation as part of the Victorian Mid Murray Storages, managed by Goulburn–Murray Water.

== Description ==
The name of the reservoir is derived from the Aboriginal word Ghow which refers to the white gypsum soil found at the swamp.

The Ghow Swamp lies in the Murray River valley, approximately 4.5 kilometres (2.8 mi) west of the town of Gunbower and 3 kilometres (1.9 mi) south of the town of Leitchville and also the Murray River, in the Shire of Campaspe. Approximately 7 kilometres (4.3 mi) in length and 4 kilometres (2.5 mi) in width, the lake has a circumference of 15 kilometres (9.3 mi). In the late 19th century Ghow Swamp was managed by local irrigation trusts for off-river storage. In 1900, the capacity was increased to 51,730 megalitres (41,940 acre⋅ft). The Torrumbarry Weir and associated channels were completed in 1923 that provided gravity supply to the reservoir. Remodelling works were completed in the 1960s.

The reservoir is a popular site for recreational fishing.

=== Protected Aboriginal place ===
The Ghow Swamp is located within the Ghow Swamp Aboriginal Place, a protected Aboriginal place, gazetted in 2022 under the Aboriginal Heritage Act 2006. The archaeological site contains the largest known single population of human skeletal remains from the late Pleistocene era, ranging from between 13,000 to 9,300 years ago.

Between the 1960s and early 1980s, Victorian Government agencies approved the excavations of remains without seeking the consent of the Traditional Owners. Government authorities claimed that the excavations would advance science; however, this was subsequently argued that the studies provided very little scientific gain. The concerns raised by the Aboriginal community were either ignored or dismissed.

In 2025, it was reported that the Australian Government was considering including the archaeological site, including the reservoir, on the National Heritage List.

== See also ==
- List of reservoirs and dams in Victoria
