= Wathaurong Aboriginal Co-operative =

Community organization in Geelong, Victoria

The Wathaurong Aboriginal Co-operative is a community organisation based in Geelong, Australia that supports the social, economic, and cultural development of Aboriginal people within the Geelong and surrounding areas. It was formed in 1978 and registered in 1980.

== Purpose ==
The Wathaurong Aboriginal Co-operative provides health, community and family services to Aboriginal people in the Geelong area. It is the largest employer of Aboriginal people in the Geelong region. A protest in 2014, claiming the organisation had "...become distanced from its community...", revolved around staff cuts, services and gatherings for the community and concerns the organisation was focused on business than the community.

== Staff ==
The chief executive officer was for many years Trevor Edwards, who was succeeded by Tracey Currie, and then Rod Jackson. In 2014, the organisation had 300 members and employed 55 staff, with a turnover of over $5m a year. The organisation operates a number of business ventures including Wathaurung Glass & Arts, and has title to land at Mount Rothwell that contains the Wurdi Youang Aboriginal stone arrangement.

== See also ==
- Wathaurong
- Wathaurung Aboriginal Corporation
