= WLH-50 =

Hominin fossil

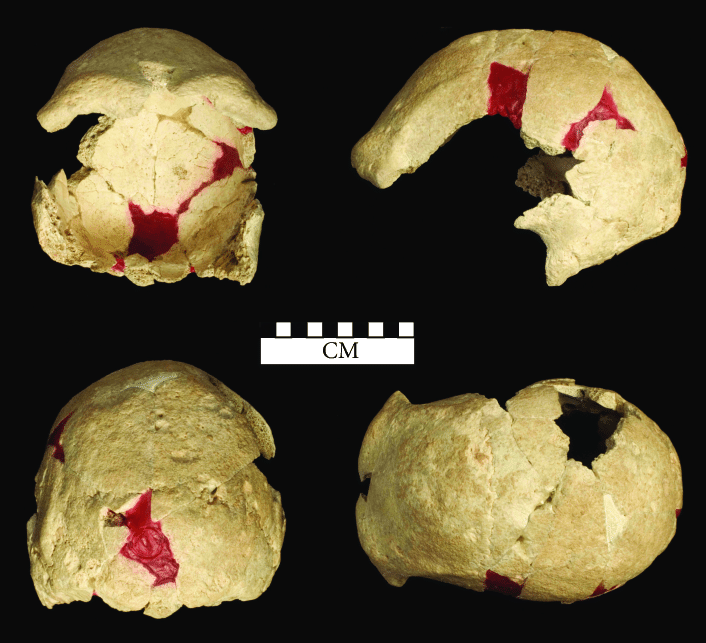
- WLH-50 skullcap
- Common name: WLH-50
- Species: Human
- Age: 29,000 years
- Place discovered: New South Wales, Australia
- Date discovered: 1982

Fossil WLH-50 is a partial cranium fossil that was discovered in 1982, in the Willandra Lakes Region of Australia and was reconstructed by Alan Thorne. Based on its overall dimensions and the growth of cranial features, WLH-50 has been determined to be a male skullcap. Speculation surrounds the exact age of this fossil hominid and a debate concerning its ancestry in relation to other late Pleistocene hominids, as well as Ngandong hominids due to their close resemblance to one another.

== Characteristics ==
It has been said that WLH-50 has many of the same features as Homo erectus, but some of WLH-50's most notable characteristics include:

- thick brow ridge
- unusually thick, dense cranial vault – 15–19 millimetres thick (supposed adaptation to malaria)
- cranial capacity – 1590cc
- extended nuchal area for muscle attachment
- occipital bun
- robust size

== Determining age ==
The fossil was discovered in a lake basin that undergoes several drying phases throughout the year. These phases cause displacements in the surrounding sediment and stratigraphy, thus making it difficult to properly date the fossil. There have been many attempts in trying to accurately date WLH-50 some of which include:

=== Radio carbon dating ===
In 1981 and 1982 the Australian National University radio carbon dating lab tested the carbonate that encrusted the bone, as well as a freshwater shell and found:

- Carbonate – 9050 ± 310 BP (calibrated to 9.5–11.1 thousand years old, 2-σ error)
- Freshwater shell – 14,380 ± 240 BP (calibrated to 16.5–18.0 thousand years old)

=== Electromagnetic spin resonance ===
In 1987, D.A. Caddie conducted ESR dating technique and calculated that the bone fragment was 29,000 ± 5,000 years old.

=== Spectrometry ===
Simpson and Grun reported in 1998 that the fossil was potentially 14,000 years old, according to gamma spectroscopy and thermal ionization mass spectrometry (TIMS)/Uranium-series dating.

It has been suggested that the latter technique provides a minimum age for this fossil, due to the fact that uranium uptake begins following burial.

== Replacement Theory vs. Multi-Regional Mode ==
An ongoing debate within paleoanthropology is whether to place Ngandong hominids as Homo sapiens.

Replacement theory predicts that Late Pleistocene Africans and Levantines are direct ancestors of WHL-50 and that Ngandong hominids are not direct ancestors of WHL-50.

The Multi-regional model considers Pleistocene Africans, Levantines, and Ngandong possible ancestors to WHL-50, making Ngandong a H. sapiens.
