= Hornfels in Victorian archaeological sites =

Hornfels is an unusual and relatively rare stone used in making flaked stone tools, and which is found in Aboriginal archaeological sites in Victoria, Australia. A sample of places where it has been found can be seen in the geographic section below.

The term has been used for ...a group of compact, fine-grained, metamorphic rocks that form as a result of contact between sedimentary country rocks and a magma intrusion. The mineral composition is variable, but commonly contains mica and pyroxene while porphyroblasts of pyroxene, cordierite or andulusite also develop. Sedimentary structures are rarely evident due to a high degree of recrystallisation.
