= Alan Templeton =

American geneticist and statistician at Washington University in St. Louis

- Born: Alan Robert Templeton
- Education: Washington University in St. Louis; University of Michigan
- Known for: Quantifying human genetic diversity
- Scientific career
- Fields: Human genetics
- Workplaces: Washington University in St. Louis, University of Haifa
- Thesis: Statistical Models of Parthenogenesis (1972)

Alan R. Templeton is an American geneticist and statistician at Washington University in St. Louis, where he is the Charles Rebstock emeritus professor of biology. From 2010 to 2019, he held positions in the Institute of Evolution and the Department of Evolutionary and Environmental Biology at the University of Haifa. He is known for his work demonstrating the degree of genetic diversity among humans and, in his opinion, the biological unreality of human races.

== Research ==
In 2002, Templeton published a genetic analysis showing that some gene variants that are present in modern populations existed already in Asia hundreds of thousands of years ago. This meant that even if our male line (Y chromosome) and our female line (mitochondrial DNA) came out of Africa in the last 100,000 years or so, we have inherited other genes from populations that were already outside of Africa. Since this study other studies have been done using much more data (see Phylogeography).

According to Templeton's research, perceived differences in races are more related to cultural perceptions and biases than any underlying genetic reality. For example, Templeton's statistical analysis of the human genome shows that much greater genetic diversity exists between populations of chimpanzees than humans from different parts of the world.

Using data from the International HapMap Project and the 1000 Genomes project, Templeton and a team of researchers looked at mutations encompassing the gephyrin gene of chromosome 14 and were able to trace the split back to the last common ancestor.
