= Wu Xinzhi =

Chinese anthropologist (1928–2021)

- 吴新智
- Born: 2 June 1928; Hefei, Anhui, China
- Died: 4 December 2021 (aged 93); Beijing, China
- Education: Shanghai Medical College
- Scientific career
- Fields: Paleoanthropology
- Workplaces: Institute of Vertebrate Paleontology and Paleoanthropology

Chinese name
- Simplified Chinese: 吴新智
- Traditional Chinese: 呉新智
Transcriptions
Standard Mandarin
- Hanyu Pinyin: Wú Xīnzhì

Wu Xinzhi (Chinese: 吴新智; 2 June 1928 – 4 December 2021) was a Chinese paleoanthropologist, academician of the Chinese Academy of Sciences, and former vice director of the Institute of Vertebrate Paleontology and Paleoanthropology (IVPP).

== Biography ==
Wu was born in Hefei, Anhui, China, in 1928. He graduated with a B.S. in medicine from Shanghai Medical College in 1953, and taught from 1953 to 1958 at the Department of Anatomy, Dalian Medical College. He then attended the graduate school of the Chinese Academy of Sciences. On 5 December 2021, he died of an illness in Beijing, aged 93.
