= Mudgegonga rock shelter =

Rock shelter and archaeological site in Victoria, Australia

Coordinates: 36°29′02″S 146°53′05″E

The Mudgegonga rock shelter is a large rock overhang which contains over 400 Aboriginal wall paintings and stencils and evidence of prehistoric Aboriginal occupation. The site is located in north eastern Victoria near the town of Mudgegonga, and is associated with rich artefact deposits that shows occupation of the region by 3,500 years ago and may have been used several thousand years before this. It has been described as one of the richest rock art sites in Victoria.

The paintings are ochre and pipeclay on rock and include the only painting of the potoroo species in Victoria. The artefact deposits associated with the shelter, which were composed predominantly of quartz, were subject to investigation by LaTobe university in the 1980s.

Plans to undertake conservation works at the site resulted in controversy when Gary Murray, co-chairman of the Dhudhuroa Native Title Group, disputed claims of another Aboriginal group to make decisions about the site and lodged an application with Heritage Minister Peter Garrett to protect the site from "a threat of injury and desecration" due to assessment and restoration activities being planned by Aboriginal Affairs Victoria.

== See also ==
- Gariwerd
- Buchan Caves
