= Ghow Swamp Aboriginal Place =

Late Pleistocene burial site in Victoria, Australia

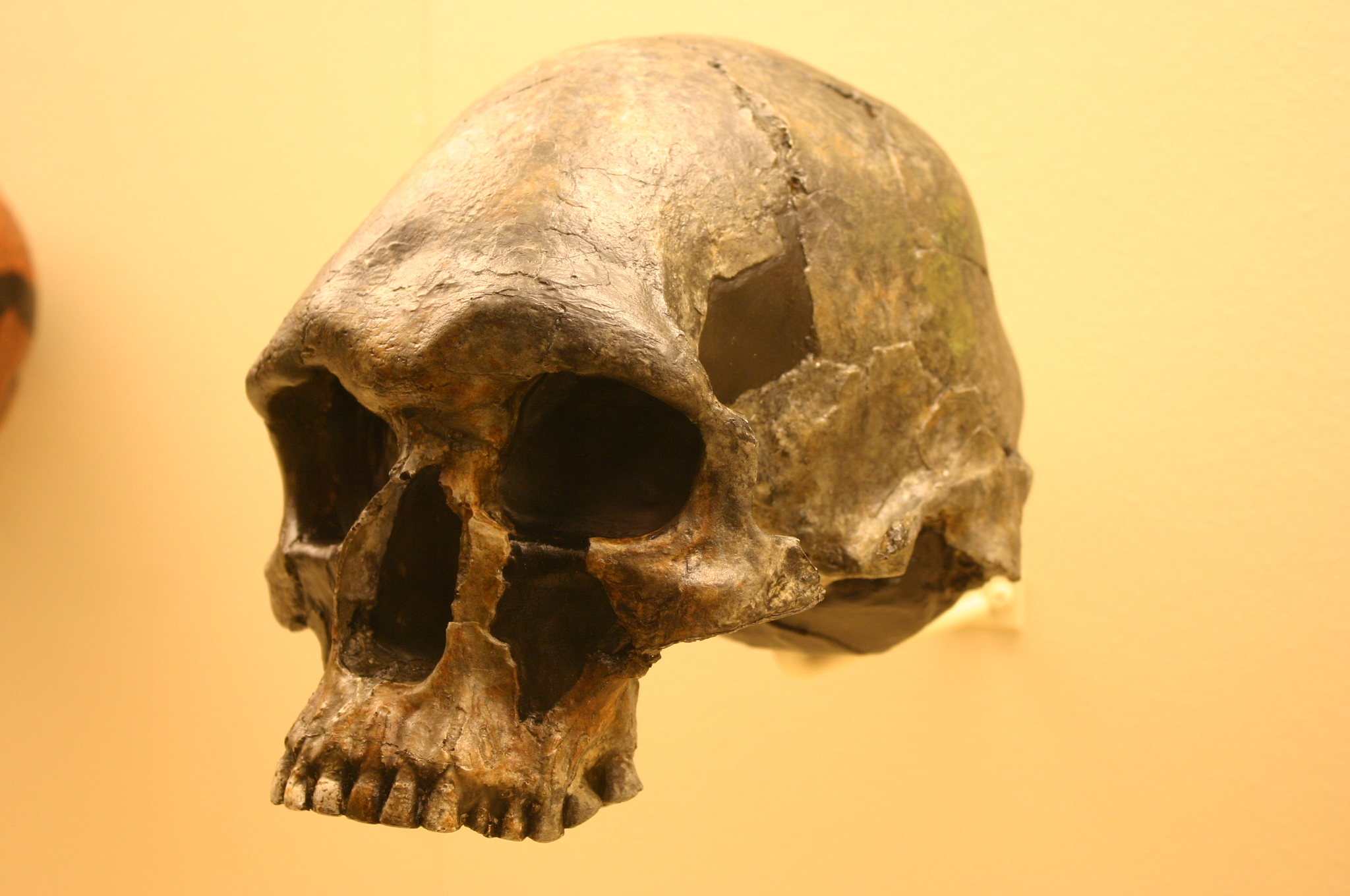
- Cast of human remains discovered at the site

- Location of the site in Victoria
- Interactive map of Ghow Swamp Aboriginal Place
- 35°57′13″S 144°19′05″E
- Type: Archaeological site; Victorian Aboriginal protected place
- Periods: late Pleistocene
- Location: North Central Victoria, Australia

Site notes
- Elevation: 80 m (260 ft)
- Area: 3,177 ha (7,850 acres)
- Archaeologists: Alan Thorne (1960s– )
- Discovered: 1925
- Owner: Yorta Yorta Nation Aboriginal Corporation

The Ghow Swamp Aboriginal Place, also known as the Kow Swamp archaeological site, is a protected Aboriginal place, gazetted in 2022 under the Aboriginal Heritage Act 2006. The archaeological site contains the largest known single population of human skeletal remains from the late Pleistocene era, ranging from between 13,000 to 9,300 years ago. The remains are situated within the lunette of the eastern rim of a former wetland known as Ghow Swamp, (Note: Formerly known as Kow Swamp.) in the North Central region of Victoria, Australia. The site is 10 kilometres (6 mi) south-east of Cohuna in the central Murray River valley and is significant for archaeological excavations by Alan Thorne between 1968 and 1972 which recovered the partial skeletal remains of more than 22 individuals.

== Etymology ==
The name of the place is derived from the Aboriginal Yorta Yorta word Ghow which refers to the white gypsum soil found at the site of the swamp. Initially called "Kow Swamp", in the early 21st century, the name was changed to "Ghow Swamp", to reflect its indigenous heritage.

== Reservoir description ==
Originally a wetland, it was filled when the Murray River is in flood or running at high levels, while the Bendigo Creek provided a smaller amount of water. A weir was constructed in 1923 and the swamp is fed by off-stream sources that created a man-made reservoir, used for irrigation purposes. The 51,730-megalitre (41,940 acre⋅ft) reservoir is 15 kilometres (9.3 mi) in circumference, with an average depth of 3 metres (9.8 ft).

== Archaeological discovery ==
There is evidence of recent Aboriginal occupation of the area from canoe trees and middens, while early Colonial settlers' records describe an Aboriginal ceremonial site on the north side of the swamp.

The most notable evidence was the discovery, in 1925, on the west side of the swamp, of the Cohuna Cranium by a local earthmoving contractor. The editor of the local newspaper Cohuna Farmers Weekly notified authorities and the significance of the discovery was realised. In the 1960s, Alan Thorne also identified archaic bone from the collection at the Museum of Victoria, and traced the find spot to Ghow (Kow) Swamp.

Between the 1960s and early 1980s, Victorian Government agencies approved the excavations of remains without seeking the consent of the Traditional Owners. Between 1968 and 1972, Thorne completed archaeological excavations on behalf of the Australian National University. Further remains were found around the swamp by an interested local resident, Gordon Spark. By 1972 the remains of at least forty individuals were excavated and studied. Government authorities claimed that the excavations would advance science and that these discoveries helped establish the diversity of Aboriginal genetic history and were interpreted as representing different waves of immigrants to Australia before European discovery. However, it was subsequently argued that the studies provided very little scientific gain. The concerns raised by the Aboriginal community were either ignored or dismissed.

=== Dating ===
Radiocarbon dates returned a wide range of ages for the burials, with 13,000 ± 280 (ANU1236) from shell in the grave of KS5 and 10,070 ± 250 (ANU-403b), from bone apatite from KS10 respectively. The youngest date was approximately 6500 BP for KS1.

Optically stimulated luminescence (OSL) dating was undertaken of the Ghow Swamp burial site in 2003 (close to KS 9, the only burial excavated in situ), which suggested that the cemetery was in use between 22 and 19 ka, rather than 15 – 9 ka. Some question the OSL dates due to the difficulty of ensuring that the dated sand is contemporary with the actual burials. However, the OSL dates from the burial units directly contradict the C14 dates, which were only ever minimum ages because of contamination by younger carbon.

=== Description of remains ===
The initial descriptions of the crania from Ghow Swamp identified "receding frontal squama, massive supraorbital regions and a supraglabella fossae..." which were considered to be "preserving an almost unmodified eastern erectus form" displaying a "..complex of archaic characteristics not seen in recent Aboriginal crania...". The features were considered to indicate "the survival of Homo erectus features in Australia until as recently as 10,000 years ago". However, Donald Brothwell disputed this interpretation suggesting the vault size and shape at Ghow Swamp had been influenced by artificial cranial deformation, particularly in Kow Swamp 5.

The varying morphological and metrical comparisons of the burials have distinguished them from modern Aboriginal crania and also a more gracile group of Pleistocene remains found at Lake Mungo and Keilor. These differences have been used to postulate separate arrivals of distinct groups of people. However, more recent comparison does not support Thorne's dual Pleistocene population model.

=== Repatriation ===
Following a campaign by Aboriginal community groups to have human remains repatriated from Australian and overseas museum collections, Museum Victoria returned the Ghow Swamp skeletons in 1990 to the Yorta Yorta people at Echuca who re-interred them. Casts of some of the Ghow Swamp crania and mandibles are held by the Archaeology and Human Sciences department at the Australian National University, with some casts (including casts of KS1 and 5) being sent to the Natural History Museum, London and other institutions. Despite extensive reconstruction, the Ghow Swamp material was extremely fragmentary, with only two of the crania, KS1 and 5, being relatively complete.

=== Protected site ===
On 6 October 2022, the 3,177-hectare (7,850-acre) site was gazetted as a protected Aboriginal place as determined by the Victorian Minister for Treaty and First Peoples, Gabrielle Williams, under the Aboriginal Heritage Act 2006.

In 2025, it was reported that the Australian Government was considering including the archaeological site on the National Heritage List.

== See also ==
- Aboriginal sites of Victoria
- Multiregional origin of modern humans
- Lake Mungo remains
