= Victorian Aboriginal Heritage Register =

The Victorian Aboriginal Heritage Register (VAHR), is a list of all known Aboriginal cultural heritage places in Victoria, Australia. It was established by and is regulated under the Aboriginal Heritage Act 2006. The Register is administered by the Office of Aboriginal Affairs Victoria, in some instances through delegation to Registered Aboriginal Parties.

The VAHR evolved from the original Archaeological and Aboriginal Relics Office, established by the Archaeological and Aboriginal Relics Preservation Act 1972.

As of 2013 it included approximately 35,000 archaeological sites, historic Aboriginal places and Aboriginal cultural artefacts.

== See also ==
- Aboriginal Victorians
