= Office of the Registrar of Indigenous Corporations =

Australian statutory body to register Indigenous corporations under the CATSI Act

The Office of the Registrar of Indigenous Corporations (ORIC) assists the Registrar of Indigenous Corporations in administering the Corporations (Aboriginal and Torres Strait Islander) Act 2006 ("CATSI Act") and in supporting and regulating corporations for Indigenous people throughout Australia. The CATSI Act is similar to the Corporations Act 2001.

The Registrar of Indigenous Corporations, formerly the Registrar of Aboriginal Corporations (1977–2007) and Registrar of Aboriginal and Torres Strait Islander Corporations (2007 – 1 May 2008), is an Australian Government statutory office appointed by the Minister for Indigenous Australians under the CATSI Act. The Registrar has powers similar to those of the Australian Securities and Investments Commission (ASIC) for corporations registered at the national level set up by Aboriginal and Torres Strait Islander people in Australia. As of May 2022 the Registrar is Tricia Stroud.

ORIC allocates and maintains a public register of Indigenous Corporation Numbers (ICNs).

== See also ==
- Department of Families, Housing, Community Services and Indigenous Affairs

Compare:

- Alaska Native Regional Corporations (USA)
- Makivik Corporation (Canada)
