= Aboriginal Heritage Act 2006 =

Australian state law

Parliament of Victoria
- Long title: An Act to provide for the protection of Aboriginal cultural heritage in Victoria, to repeal the Archaeological and Aboriginal Relics Preservation Act 1972 and for other purposes.
- Citation: No. 16 of 2006
- Royal assent: 9 May 2006

The Aboriginal Heritage Act 2006 (No. 16 of 2006) (AHA) of the state of Victoria, Australia was enacted "to provide for the protection of Aboriginal cultural heritage in Victoria". It established Registered Aboriginal Parties to act as the "primary guardians, keepers and knowledge holders of Aboriginal cultural heritage". They protect and manage the Aboriginal cultural heritage in Victoria. The Act also established the Victorian Aboriginal Heritage Council and the Victorian Aboriginal Heritage Register, gave powers for Authorised Officers and Aboriginal Heritage Officers, and laid out Cultural Heritage Management Plans (CHMPs) and Cultural Heritage Permit processes, to manage activities that may impact Aboriginal cultural heritage. The act replaced the Archaeological and Aboriginal Relics Preservation Act of 1972, which was widely viewed as insufficient in protecting Aboriginal and Torres Strait Islander cultural heritage.

The long title for the Bill was "to provide for the protection of Aboriginal cultural heritage in Victoria, to repeal the Archaeological and Aboriginal Relics Preservation Act 1972 and for other purposes". The Act is No. 16 of 2006 and was assented to on 9 May 2006. It was effective from 28 May 2007, and gazetted on 24 May 2007.

Further to the Act, the Aboriginal Heritage Regulations 2018 prescribe standards, set out the circumstances in which a CHMP should be prepared and set fees and charges. The Regulations also define "high impact activities" and "areas of cultural heritage sensitivity".

== Objectives ==
The objectives, stated in Section 3 of the Act, are:

(a) to recognise, protect and conserve Aboriginal cultural heritage in Victoria in ways that are based on respect for Aboriginal knowledge and cultural and traditional practices;

(b) to recognise Aboriginal people as the primary guardians, keepers and knowledge holders of Aboriginal cultural heritage;

(c) to accord appropriate status to traditional owners, including a preference to appoint traditional owner bodies corporate as registered Aboriginal parties;

(d) to promote the management of Aboriginal cultural heritage as an integral part of land and natural resource management;

(e) to promote public awareness and understanding of Aboriginal cultural heritage in Victoria;

(f) to establish an Aboriginal cultural heritage register to record Aboriginal cultural heritage;

(g) to establish processes for the timely and efficient assessment of activities that have the potential to harm Aboriginal cultural heritage;

(h) to promote the use of agreements that provide for the management and protection of Aboriginal cultural heritage;

(i) to establish mechanisms that enable the resolution of disputes relating to the protection of Aboriginal cultural heritage;

(j) to provide appropriate sanctions and penalties to prevent harm to Aboriginal cultural heritage;

== Effects ==
According to the National Indigenous Times, the system created by the act has become "a system through which cultural legitimacy is determined", which they view as problematic due to the breadth and depth of living cultures. In 2012, the Victoria Department of Planning and Community Development published a book on its socioeconomic impacts.

== Updates ==
In 2021, the Victorian Aboriginal Heritage Council advised amendments.

== See also ==
- Budj Bim heritage areas
- Ghow Swamp Aboriginal Place
- Gunditj Mirring Traditional Owners Aboriginal Corporation
