= Aboriginal land rights legislation in Australia =

Commonwealth, State, and Territory Parliaments of Australia have passed Aboriginal land rights legislation.

== Aboriginal Lands Trust Act 1966 (SA) ==
The Aboriginal Lands Trust Act 1966 established the South Australian Aboriginal Lands Trust.

== Aboriginal Lands Act 1970 (VIC) ==
Victorian Aboriginal Lands Act 1970

== Aboriginal Land Rights Act 1976 (Cwth) ==
The Aboriginal Land Rights (Northern Territory) Act 1976 (ALRA) provides the basis upon which Aboriginal Australian people in the Northern Territory can claim rights to land based on traditional occupation. It was the first law by any Australian government that legally recognised the Aboriginal system of land ownership, and legislated the concept of inalienable freehold title, as such was a fundamental piece of social reform.

As a result of the findings of the Woodward Aboriginal Land Rights Commission, a Royal Commission, the Fraser Government enacted the Aboriginal Land Rights Act in 1976, after its drafting by the Whitlam Labor Government in 1975. Four land councils were established under this law. It established the basis upon which Aboriginal people in the Northern Territory could, for the first time, claim rights to land based on traditional occupation. This Act was the first Australian law which allowed a claim of title if claimants could provide evidence of their traditional association with land.

== Aboriginal and Torres Strait Islanders (Queensland Reserves and Communities Self-Management) Act 1978 (Cwth) ==
The Aboriginal and Torres Strait Islanders (Queensland Reserves and Communities Self-Management) Act 1978 was repealed by the Prime Minister and Cabinet Legislation Amendment (2017 Measures No. 1) Act 2018.

== Local Government (Aboriginal Lands) Act 1978 (Qld) ==
The Queensland 1978 Local Government (Aboriginal Lands) Act transferred land leases to the shires of Aurukun and Mornington.

== Anangu Pitjantjatjara Yankunytjatjara Land Rights Act 1981 (SA) ==
The Anangu Pitjantjatjara Yankunytjatjara Land Rights Act 1981 of South Australia (formerly the Pitjantjatjara Land Rights Act) enabled land to be transferred to the Pitjantjatjara people, who had maintained a continuous connection with their land. However, the act provided no basis for claims by other groups.

== Aboriginal Land Rights Act 1983 (NSW) ==
The Aboriginal Land Rights Act 1983 It is a New South Wales statute that was established to return land to Aboriginal peoples through a process of lodging claims for certain Crown lands and the establishment of Aboriginal Land Councils. It was introduced in New South Wales in 1983 and repealed the Aborigines Act 1969. The Aboriginal Land Rights Act 1983 introduced land rights for Aboriginal people in New South Wales, allowing the Aboriginal Land Councils constituted under the Act to claim land as compensation for historic dispossession of land and to support the social and economic development of Aboriginal communities.

The Aboriginal Land Rights Act 1983 provided land rights for Aboriginal persons, representative Aboriginal Land Councils, vested land in those Councils, provided for acquisition and management of land, and for the provision of community benefit schemes by or on behalf of those Councils.

== Aborigines and Torres Strait Islanders (Land Holding) Act 1985 (QLD) ==
The Aborigines and Torres Strait Islander Act, brought in by Bob Katter, enabled the issuing of perpetual leases on existing Indigenous Lands in Queensland to Indigenous individuals.

== Aboriginal Land Grant (Jervis Bay Territory) Act 1986 (Cwlth) ==
The 1986 Commonwealth Aboriginal Land Grant (Jervis Bay Territory) established the Wreck Bay Aboriginal Community Council and grants land to the council.

== Aboriginal Land (Lake Condah and Framlingham Forest) Act 1987 (Cwlth) ==
The Aboriginal Land (Lake Condah and Framlingham Forest) Act 1987 (sometimes referred to as the Aboriginal Land Act 1987) vests land to nominated Aboriginal Corporations.

== Aboriginal Land (Northcote Land) Act 1989 (VIC) ==
The purpose of the Victorian Aboriginal Land (Northcote Land) Act is to authorise the granting by the Crown of land at Northcote to the Aborigines Advancement League Incorporated.

== Aboriginal Lands Act 1991 (VIC) ==
The main purpose of the Victorian Aboriginal Lands Act 1991 was to revoke the reservations of certain lands, and authorise the granting of that land for Aboriginal cultural and burial purposes.

== Aboriginal Land Act 1991 and Torres Strait Islander Land Act 1991 (QLD) ==
These two acts, the Aboriginal Land Act and the Torres Strait Islander Land Act, superseded the Aborigines and Torres Strait Islanders (Land Holding) Act 1985.

== Aboriginal Land (Manatunga Land) Act 1992 (VIC) ==
The purpose of the Victorian Aboriginal Land (Manatunga Land) Act is to authorise the grant by the Crown of land at Robinvale to the Murray Valley Aboriginal Co-operative Limited and to extinguish a Crown lease and any other encumbrances existing over that land.

== Aboriginal Lands Act 1995 (TAS) ==
The Aboriginal Lands Act 1995 created the Tasmanian Aboriginal Land Council and defined lands vested in the council.

== See also ==
- Aboriginal land rights in Australia
- Aboriginal reserves
- List of laws concerning Indigenous Australians
- Native title legislation in Australia
