= Wave Hill walk-off =

1966–1975 strike by Aboriginal Australians

Coordinates: 17.3870°S 131.1164°E

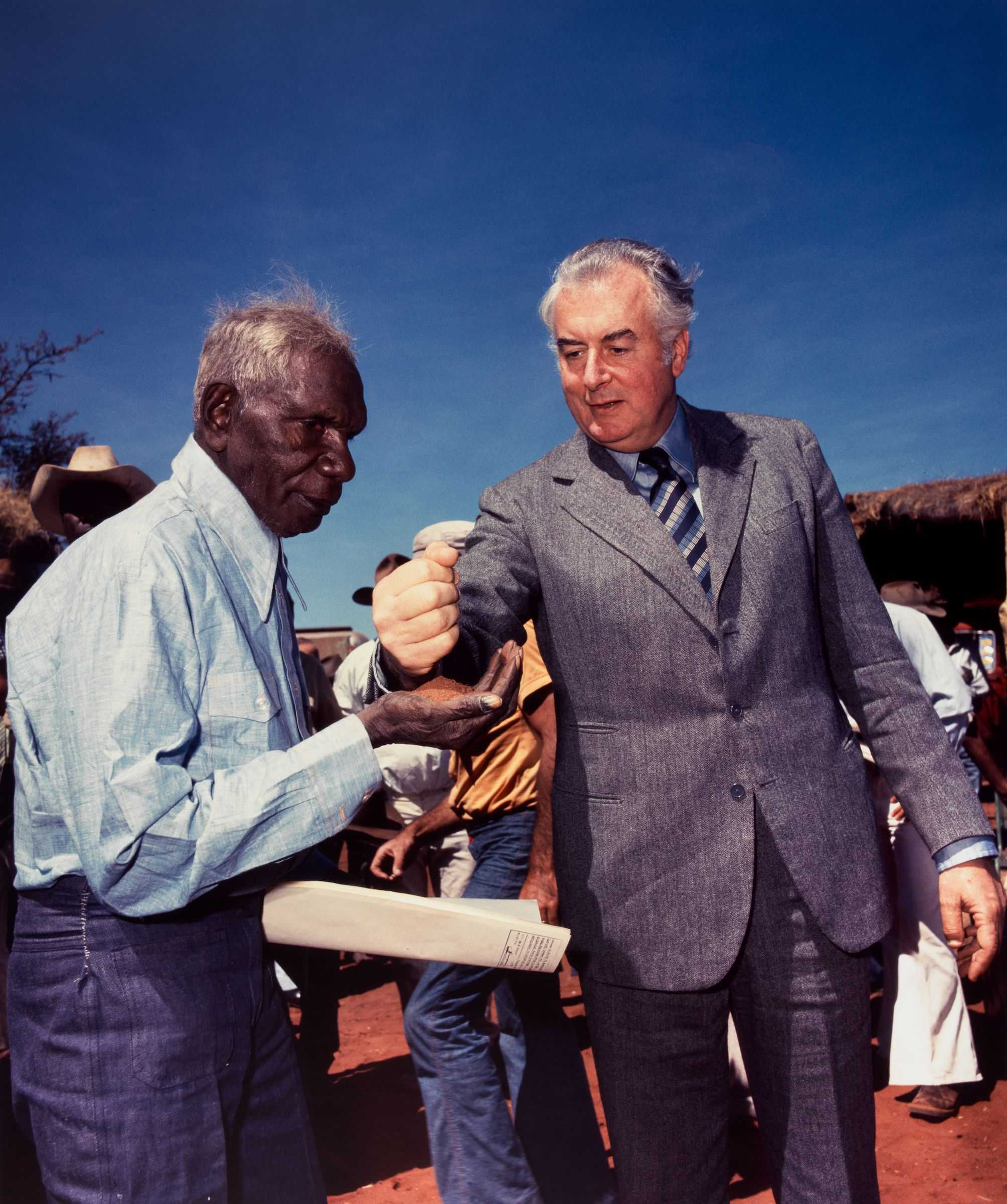
Gough Whitlam pouring dirt through Vincent Lingiari's fingers, signifying the handing-back of Gurindji land

The Wave Hill walk-off, also known as the Gurindji strike, was a walk-off and strike by 200 Gurindji stockmen, house servants and their families, starting on 23 August 1966 and lasting for seven years. It took place at Wave Hill, a cattle station in Kalkarindji (formerly known as Wave Hill), Northern Territory, Australia, and was led by Gurindji man Vincent Lingiari.

Though initially interpreted merely as a strike against working and living conditions, the primary demand was for return of some of the traditional lands of the Gurindji people, which had covered approximately 3,250 square kilometres (1,250 sq mi) of the Northern Territory before European settlement. The walk-off persisted until 16 August 1975, when—after brokering an agreement with titular landowners the Vestey Group—Prime Minister Gough Whitlam was able to give the rights to a piece of land back to the Gurindji people in a highly symbolic handover ceremony. It was a key moment in the movement for Aboriginal land rights in Australia, which was one of the main events leading to the passing of the Aboriginal Land Rights Act 1976. This legislation was the basis on which Indigenous Australians could apply for freehold title to traditional lands in the Northern Territory.

The event was later celebrated in the song "From Little Things Big Things Grow", written by Paul Kelly and Kev Carmody in 1991, and Freedom Day is celebrated in August of each year at Kalkarindji to commemorate the strike.

On 8 September 2020, the traditional owners were granted native title over 5,000 square kilometres (1,900 sq mi) of the Wave Hill Station land.

== Gurindji and the pastoralists ==
The Gurindji, an Aboriginal Australian people, had lived on their traditional land in the remote Victoria River area for tens of thousands of years. These lands cover approximately 3,250 square kilometres (1,250 sq mi) of what is now the Northern Territory. They first encountered Europeans around 1844-1845, when explorer Augustus Gregory crossed into their territory. From 1855 to 1856 Gregory led an expedition from the plains of the Victoria River eastward across the NT to the Queensland coast. In 1879 Alexander Forrest journeyed through this land from the coast of Western Australia to the Overland Telegraph Line.

An area of about 3,000 km^{2} (1,200 sq mi), which included the Kalkaringi and Daguragu area, was granted to pastoralist Nathaniel Buchanan in 1883 for the Wave Hill cattle station. It was stocked with 1000 cattle in 1884, and 10 years later, there were 15,000 cattle and 8,000 bullocks, which started to degrade the environment. The land management practices adhered to by the Gurindji for millennia could not be followed.

The Gurindji and other Aboriginal peoples found their waterholes and soakages fenced off or fouled by cattle, which also ate or trampled fragile desert plant life, such as bush tomato. Dingo hunters ("doggers") regularly shot the people's hunting dogs as well as kangaroos as they competed with cattle for water and grazing land. Gurindji suffered lethal reprisals for any attempt to eat the cattle – anything from a skirmish to a massacre. There was little choice to stay alive but to move onto the cattle stations, receive rations, adopt a more sedentary life and, where possible, take work as stockmen and domestic help. If they couldn't continue their traditional way of life, then at least to be on their own land – the foundation for their spiritual beliefs – was crucial. The pastoralists wanted cheap labour, and workers were exploited and abused.

Legislation passed in 1913 required employers to provide Aboriginal workers food, clothes, tea and tobacco in exchange for their work. Pastoralists were able to make use of the now landless Aboriginal people, who wanted to stay on their traditional lands, as extremely cheap manual labour. On stations across the north, Aboriginal people became the backbone of the cattle industry for the next 70 years.

In 1914, Wave Hill Station was bought by Vestey Brothers, then an international meat-packing company founded and run by William and Edmund Vestey. The Vesteys refused to pay their workers in wages, leading to tensions and arguments from the beginning.

== Conditions on the station ==
There had been complaints from Indigenous employees about conditions over many years. A Northern Territory government inquiry held in the 1930s said of Vesteys:

It was obvious that they had been ... quite ruthless in denying their Aboriginal labour proper access to basic human rights.

However, little was done over the decades leading up to the strike. While it was illegal up until 1968 to pay Aboriginal workers more than a specified amount in goods and money, a 1945 inquiry found Vesteys was not even paying Aboriginal workers the 5 shillings a day ($0.50 as of 2023) minimum wage set up for Aboriginal workers under the Aboriginals Ordinance 1918. Non-Indigenous men were receiving £2/8/- ($A213.76 as of 2025) a week in 1945. Gurindji lived in humpies made of corrugated iron, without floors, lighting, sanitation, furniture or cooking facilities. Billy Bunter Jampijinpa, who lived on Wave Hill Station at the time said:

"We were treated just like dogs. We were lucky to get paid the 50 quid a month we were due, and we lived in tin humpies you had to crawl in and out on your knees. There was no running water. The food was bad – just flour, tea, sugar and bits of beef like the head or feet of a bullock. The Vesteys mob were hard men. They didn't care about black fellas."

A 1946 report by anthropologists (Catherine Berndt and Ronald Berndt) exposed the conditions faced by the workers. Aboriginal children under 12 were working illegally, housing and food was inadequate, there was sexual abuse of Aboriginal women, and prostitution in exchange for rations and clothing was occurring. Sanitation was poor and there was no safe source of drinking water.

Gurindji who received minimal government benefits had these paid into pastoral company accounts over which they had no control. In contrast, non-Aboriginal workers enjoyed minimum wage security with no legal limit on the maximum they could be paid. They were housed in comfortable homes with gardens and had full control over their finances.

In 1953, the Aboriginals Ordinance 1953 amended the Aboriginals Ordinance 1918 (NT). This empowered the Director of Native Affairs (previously Chief Protector of Aborigines until changed by the Aboriginals Ordinance 1939) with legal guardianship of all "aboriginals", thus making them wards of the state. He would also oversee many matters relevant to the lives of Aboriginal people.

In 1959, the Wards Employment Regulations set out a scale of wages, rations and conditions applicable to wards of the state, at rates up to 50 per cent lower than those of non-Aboriginal people working in similar occupations. Still Samuel Vestey, 3rd Baron Vestey, known as Lord Vestey, refused to pay any wages to the company's Aboriginal workers.

In 1965, the North Australian Workers' Union (NAWU), under pressure from the Northern Territory Council for Aboriginal Rights (NTCAR) and driven by their own Aboriginal organiser, Dexter Daniels, applied to the Commonwealth Conciliation and Arbitration Commission to amend the Northern Territory's pastoral award to remove sections discriminating against Aboriginal workers. The pastoralists resisted strongly; the Commission eventually agreed in March 1966, but in consideration of the pastoralists' concerns of what it would cost them, delayed implementation by three years.

By August 1966, the Gurindji had had enough of waiting for an improvement to their living and working conditions, and a campaign in solidarity with their cause had stirred support across the country. Writer Frank Hardy organised a speaking tour for Daniels, and through their networks and unions in Sydney and Melbourne collected thousands of pounds for a strike fund. NTCAR provided support and publicity for the strike.

== 1966–75: Strike years ==
=== The walk-off ===
On 23 August 1966, led by Lingiari, about 200 workers (stockmen and domestic servants) and their families walked off Wave Hill and began their ten-year strike for better pay and conditions and land rights. Lingiari led the Gurindji, as well as Ngarinman, Bilinara, Warlpiri and Mudbara workers.

In March 1967, the Gurindji decided to move from their first camp in the dry bed of the Victoria River to an important sacred site nearby at Wattie Creek/Daguragu. Initially, the action was interpreted by most of the white people as purely a strike against work and living conditions. However, it soon became clear that the strikers not only demanded wages equal to those of white stockmen, but also the return of their land. The move was symbolic, away from the cattle station and closer to the Gurindji sacred sites, and marked.

At the time of the move, the strikers drafted a petition to the then Governor-General of Australia, Lord Casey, asking for a lease of 1,300 km^{2} (500 sq mi) around Daguragu, to be run cooperatively by the Gurindji as a mining and cattle lease. The petition said "We feel that morally the land is ours and should be returned to us". However, in June Casey refused the lease.

"This bin [been] Gurindji country long time before them Vestey mob", Vincent Lingiari told Hardy at the time.

Hardy records Pincher Manguari as saying:

We want them Vestey mob all go away from here. Wave Hill Aboriginal people bin called Gurindji. We bin here long time before them Vestey mob. This is our country, all this bin Gurindji country. Wave Hill bin our country. We want this land; we strike for that.

Billy Bunter Jampijinpa was 16 years old at the time of the walk-off:

The Vesteys mob came and said they would get two killers (slaughtered beasts) and raise our wages if we came back. But old Vincent said, 'No, we're stopping here'. Then in early 1967 we walked to our new promised land, we call it Daguragu (Wattie Creek), back to our sacred places and our country, our new homeland.

The Gurindji stayed on at Daguragu from 1967 until 1974, although under Australian law this was an illegal occupation. Other petitions and requests move back and forth between the Gurindji and the Northern Territory and Australian Governments, without resolution. While living at Daguragu, the Gurindji people drew up maps showing areas they wanted excised from pastoralist land and returned to them. In 1967, they petitioned the Governor-General, claiming 1,295 square kilometres (500 sq mi) of land near Wave Hill. Their claim was rejected.

The strike started having an impact on nearby stations; some had increased their Aboriginal workers' pay, fearing strike action.

In late 1966, the Northern Territory government offered a compromise pay rise of 125 per cent, but the strikers still demanded wages equal to those of white stockmen and return of their land. The Government also made moves to cut off means of Gurindji obtaining food supplies and threatened evictions. The Gurindji persisted with their protest and stayed at Daguragu.

=== Support ===
The tide of public opinion was beginning to turn in Australia. Demonstrations and arrests occurred in southern Australia, and many church, student and trade union groups gave practical and fundraising support to the Gurindji struggle. The struggle would, however, continue for another eight years, during which Lingiari, Jampijinpa and others toured the country, giving talks, raising awareness, and building support for their cause. They arranged meetings with prominent lawyers and politicians.

Writer Frank Hardy recalled one fundraising meeting at which a donor gave A$500 after hearing Lingiari speak. The donor – who said he had never before met an Aboriginal person – was a young Dr Fred Hollows, the eye surgeon and Communist activist. Brian Manning garnered support at the Waterside Workers' conference in Sydney, recommending to members a A$1 per member national levy to support the Gurindji claim for their land. This raised a A$17,000 in the Gurindji's battle for their land rights. The money spent on building fences as well as a massive campaign. Workers in Vesteys' meatworks in London took a day of strike action and sent donations.

Several significant events marked a change in public opinion in Australia. In 1967, an overwhelming majority of Australians – over 90 per cent of voters and a majority in all six states – voted "Yes" to giving the Federal Government power to make laws specifically for Indigenous Australians, in the 1967 Referendum.

In 1968, 60 Aboriginal workers at another Vestey's property, Limbunya, also joined the strike when they walked off the job.

In 1968, Hardy published The Unlucky Australians, with a foreword by Donald Horne and contributions by Lingiari, Aboriginal Union organiser Daniel Dexter, Aboriginal actor Robert Tudawali and Captain Major, telling the story of the Gurindji people based on personal narratives, and the Gurindji Strike.

Also in 1968, the Liberal-National Coalition federal government under John Gorton offered 20 houses at Wave Hill Welfare Settlement (now Kalkarindji), but the Gurindji would not be enticed by this. In 1969 the government was given a proposal to give 8 square kilometres (3.1 sq mi) back to the Gurindji. Cabinet refused even to discuss the issue.

Meanwhile, the Yolngu people of northeast Arnhem Land were taking their grievances to the courts, in the case of Milirrpum v Nabalco, also known as the Gove land rights case, after unsuccessfully petitioning the Commonwealth government with the Yirrkala bark petitions. The judge's decision in Gove in April 1971 held that native title did not form part of Australian law, thereby not recognising any rights of Yolngu rights to their land and ensuring the security of a bauxite mine by Nabalco. Coupled with the ongoing Gurindji strike, this case highlighted the very real need for Aboriginal land rights.

==== People ====
People involved in the struggle included:

- Leaders: Vincent Lingiari, Pincher Manguari, Mick Rangiari, Lupna Giari
- Partners: Gerry Ngalgardji, Long-John Kitgnaari, Gurindji people
- External allies: FCAATSI, Communist Party of Australia, North Australian Workers' Union, Northern Territory Council for Aboriginal Rights, Abschol, Methodist Commission on Aboriginal Affairs, National Missionary Council, Society of Friends
- Others: writer Frank Hardy, Dexter Daniels, Brian Manning, Frank Engel (1911–2006; ecumenical leader, associate general secretary of the Australian Council of Churches), and Liberal politician William C. Wentworth

=== 1972–75 Whitlam government ===
On 2 December 1972 the Australian Labor Party (ALP) came to power under Prime Minister Gough Whitlam. Aboriginal land rights was an issue high on the Whitlam government's agenda. It called a halt to development leases granted by the Northern Territory Land Board that might damage Indigenous rights and suspended mining exploration licences.

The Whitlam government established the Royal Commission into Aboriginal Land Rights in the Northern Territory, headed by Justice Woodward in 1972 ("the Woodward Royal Commission"). The Inquiry's task was to examine the legal establishment of land rights. The Commission recommended government financial support for the creation of reserves and incorporated land trusts, administered by traditional owners or land councils.

The original Wave Hill contract ended in March 1973, and two new ones were drafted, one for Vestey and one for the Gurindji, through their Murramulla Gurindji Company.

== 1975 – Handback ==
In 1975, the Labor government of Gough Whitlam finally negotiated with the Vesteys company to give the Gurindji back a small portion of their land. Whitlam arrived in Daguragu on 16 August 1975. This was a symbolic moment in the land rights movement in Australia for Indigenous Australians, although only an initial step towards the final land handback; it was only a 30-year pastoral lease over a very small area. Whitlam poured a handful of soil through Lingiari's fingers addressed him and the Gurindji people, saying:

"On this great day, I, Prime Minister of Australia, speak to you on behalf of all Australian people – all those who honour and love this land we live in. For them I want to say to you: I want this to acknowledge that we Australians have still much to do to redress the injustice and oppression that has for so long been the lot of Black Australians. Vincent Lingiari, I solemnly hand to you these deeds as proof, in Australian law, that these lands belong to the Gurindji people and I put into your hands part of the earth itself as a sign that this land will be the possession of you and your children forever."

Mervyn Bishop's photograph of Whitlam pouring sand into Lingiari's hand on that day, has become an iconic one in Australian history.

== Significance and legacy ==
As a result of the recommendations of the Woodward Inquiry, the Whitlam government drafted the Aboriginal Land Rights Bill. The legislation was not passed by parliament prior to the Whitlam government's dismissal in 1975, but the subsequent Fraser government passed effectively similar legislation – the Aboriginal Land Rights Act 1976 (ALRA) – on 9 December 1976. This was the first legislation in Australia which allows for a claim of land title if the claimants can provide evidence of their traditional connection to the land.

Vincent Lingiari confronted the vast economic and political forces arrayed against him and his people. The walk-off and strike were landmark events in the struggle for Aboriginal land rights in Australia. The Gurindji strike was not the first or the only demand by Aboriginal people for the return of their lands – but it was the first one to attract wide public support within Australia for land rights. For the first time recognition was given of Indigenous people, their rights and responsibilities for the land, and their ability to practise their law, language and culture. In August every year, a large celebration is held at Kalkaringi to mark the anniversary of the strike and walk-off. Known as Freedom Day, people gather from many parts of Australia to celebrate and re-enact the walk-off. However, it wasn't until May 1986 that the Gurindji won a more significant claim under the ALRA, when the Hawke government at last handed over the inalienable Aboriginal freehold title deeds to the Gurindji. Also, the ALRA was limited to the NT, and explicitly excluded urban claims such those made by the Larrakia people of Darwin.

In 2006 an Australian Senate report looked into the matter of underpayment of Indigenous workers in the past. A group of those involved in the Wave Hill walk-off have said that they would be prepared to make a reparation claim for underpaid and stolen wages as a test case.

Seven associated sites were registered on the Register of the National Estate in 1998, a list archived since its closure in 2007. The walk-off route was listed on the Northern Territory Heritage Register on 23 August 2006 and on the Australian National Heritage List on 9 August 2007. The site covers around 20 km (12 mi), starting from Wave Hill Station and ending at Daguragu. In 2023, several items were demolished or removed, including signs detailing its significance, an historic windmill and fence, a large solar panel system, and fences blocking access to the area. Charges were going to be laid in January 2024.

Unfortunately, Lingiari's vision of "a separate but equal settlement, land and cultural and political autonomy" did not happen. The Murramulla Aboriginal-owned cattle business did not survive, for a range of reasons. The Wave Hill Welfare Settlement attracted more people because of government funding and services, and Kalkarindji (as it is now known) is the service centre for the smaller Dagaragu (formerly Wattie Creek) settlement. Since a 2008 local government restructure, Kalkarindji/Daguragu ward is one of five wards of the Victoria Daly Region council.

Each year, more than 1000 people travel from around Australia to recreate the route taken by Lingiari, the stockmen and their families.

== 2020 native title recognition ==
A native title claim was lodged in 2016 by the Central Land Council, as there were mining interests in area covered by Wave Hill Station's pastoral lease. On 8 September 2020, the Federal Court of Australia recognised the native title rights of the Gurindji people to 5,000 square kilometres (1,900 sq mi) of the Wave Hill Station, allowing them to receive royalties as compensation from resource companies who explore the area. Justice Richard White said that the determination recognised Indigenous involvement (Jamangku, Japuwuny, Parlakuna-Parkinykarni and Yilyilyimawu peoples) with the land "at least since European settlement and probably for millennia". The court sitting took place nearly 800 kilometres (500 mi) south of Darwin, and descendants of Lingiari and others involved in the walk-off celebrated the determination.

The traditional owners will participate in the mining negotiations and exploration work, from which royalties may flow in the future, but just as important is the right to hunt, gather, teach and perform cultural activities and ceremonies, and allow the young people to connect with their land.

== In popular culture ==
"Gurindji Blues"

Single by Galarrwuy Yunupingu
- B-side: "The Tribal Land"
- Released: 1971
- Length: Introduction by Vincent Lingiari – 1:06; Gurindji Blues – 2:30
- Label: RCA Victor
- Songwriter: Ted Egan
- Producer: Ron Wills

=== "Gurindji Blues" ===
Ted Egan wrote the song "Gurindji Blues" in 1969 with Lingiari. The words to the first verse are:

Poor Bugger Me, Gurindji
Me bin sit down this country
Long before no Lord Vestey
All about land belong to we

Egan says he was moved to write "Gurindji Blues" after he heard Peter Nixon, then Minister for the Interior, say in parliament that if the Gurindji wanted land, they should save up and buy it, like any other Australian. Nixon also gets a mention in the song:

Poor bugger me, Gurindji
Peter Nixon talk long we:
'Buy you own land, Gurindji
Buyim back from the Lord Vestey'

In 1971, the song was recorded by in Sydney, with Egan singing along with Galarrwuy Yunupingu, a Yolngu man actively involved in land rights for his own people through the Yirrkala bark petitions and Gove land rights case (who also sings on the B-side). Lingiari speaks the introduction, first in Gurindji and then in English.

=== "From Little Things Big Things Grow" ===
In 1991, Paul Kelly and Kev Carmody recorded "From Little Things Big Things Grow". The words to the first verse are:

Gather round, people, I'll tell you a story
An eight-year-long story of power and pride
'Bout British Lord Vestey and Vincent Lingiari
They were opposite men on opposite sides

The words to the last verse are:

That was the story of Vincent Lingiari
But this is the story of something much more
How power and privilege can not move a people
Who know where they stand and stand in the law.

The song was added to the National Film and Sound Archive's Sounds of Australia registry in 2010.

=== "Wave Hill Walk Off" ===
Irish folk musician Damien Dempsey's song "Wave Hill Walk Off", on his 2016 album No Force on Earth, commemorates the Gurindji strike and the struggle for Aboriginal land rights.

The words to the first verse are:

In the year of Lord Jesus nineteen and sixty six,
A great rumbling sound came from up in the sticks,
All these gentle black warriors they dreamed of a Bill,
And enough was enough, so they walked off Wave Hill.

The words to the last verse are:

For nine hungry years they kept up their bold stand,
And took off with and poured land into Vincent's hand
For indigenous land rights it was finally time,
For to make reparations for a giant of a crime.

=== Freedom Day ===
The Freedom Day March occurs each year to commemorate the Gurindji strike. In recent years, it has become part of a larger festival known as the Freedom Day Festival, which includes an extensive program of music; talks, including the Vincent Lingiari Memorial Lecture; sport in the form of Aussie rules (the Wave Hill Walk-off Cup and Vincent Lingiari Cup) and women's basketball (the Blanch Jingaya Cup); fashion, fireworks, art and culture.

In the Gurindji language, the song "Freedom Day" celebrates the walk-off and is performed by Gurindji singers at the annual Freedom Day festival at Kalkaringi. It is an example of wajarra, popular songs performed for fun and entertainment.

== See also ==
- 1946 Pilbara strike
- Native title in Australia
