= Brian Manning (trade unionist and activist) =

Australian trade unionist and activist

Brian Thomas Manning (13 October 1932 – 3 November 2013) was an Australian trade unionist and political activist. He was active in supporting the Gurindji strike at Wave Hill, a pivotal event in the early Australian Aboriginal land-rights movement. He was also heavily involved in the campaign for an independent East Timor as well as the anti-racism movement and a number of other causes. He was a dedicated trade unionist, a secretary of the Northern Territory branch of the Waterside Workers' Federation of Australia and a co-founder of the Northern Territory Trades and Labor Council.

== Early life ==
Manning was born in Mundubbera, Queensland. In 1941, he moved with his family to Brisbane. He attended Brisbane High School until the age of seventeen, leaving to work as a junior clerk. In the following years, he worked as a storeman, labourer, spray painter and builder. He moved to Darwin in 1956, working in a number of occupations including carpenter, patrol officer, fireman and manager of the Darwin Workers’ Club. He became a waterside worker in 1966 and remained in the industry for the next thirty-five years, including stints as a union official.

Manning taught himself saxophone at an early age and played in a number of entertainment venues in Darwin in the 1950s and 1960s. He joined the Darwin branch of the Communist Party of Australia (CPA) in 1959 and remained active in it until the party's disbandment in 1991.

== The Northern Territory Council for Aboriginal Rights ==
In the late 1950s and early 1960s, Manning became friends with a number of indigenous activists, including Davis Daniels and Jacob and Phillip Roberts. He returned from attending a CPA congress in Melbourne in 1961 with a copy of the constitution of the Victorian Council on Aboriginal Rights and suggested to them they form a similar organisation. The proposal was well received and the Northern Territory Council for Aboriginal Rights (NTCAR) was founded at a meeting of 26 Aboriginal and two white Australians.

Manning recounts how at the time it was common for conservative non-indigenous forces to stack out indigenous support organisations to prevent them effectively representing indigenous interests. To prevent this, he was instrumental in inserting a clause into the NTCAR constitution stipulating that 75% of the executive would be from an indigenous background. Manning himself was elected assistant secretary.

In the following years the organisation worked against discrimination and in favour of equal wages for Aboriginal workers. It also pushed for the North Australian Workers Union, of which Manning was a member, to take up the cause of equal pay for indigenous workers.

== The “Stayput Malayans” ==
In 1961, the Federal Government moved to deport three Malayan pearl divers and long term residents of Darwin who had lost their employment due to a downturn in the industry. Deportations on racial grounds were common under the dominant White Australia policy. Incensed by this treatment of individuals and seeing it as a way of challenging the White Australia policy, Manning and other activists formed an anti-deportation committee and organised a petition against their expulsion.

The three men were known and popular in the Darwin community and a rally and march in September 1961 in their support attracted thousands. Supported by members of the community, the men went into hiding. Manning and others in the committee coordinated their movement between houses as homes suspected of harbouring them were searched on a regular basis. The men were granted a respite on 26 September, when they obtained a promise that their cases would be reviewed in return for them reporting daily to Immigration. They were flown to Melbourne where they were feted by a support movement which targeted the Immigration Minister with protests. Upon their return to Darwin it became clear Immigration was again planning their deportation. Manning and others drove them out of Darwin to a property where they remained for the remainder of the campaign.

With the campaign gaining increasing prominence around the country and highlighting opposition to the White Australia policy, the Federal Government relented and allowed them stay in early 1962.

== Wave Hill walk-off and strike ==
In 1966, Vincent Lingiari led a walk-off of the Gurindji people at the Wave Hill cattle station, 600 kilometres (370 miles) south of Darwin, in protest over wages and conditions which were then a fraction of their non-indigenous counterparts. Although occupied by the international food company Vestey Brothers, the station was on the traditional land of the Gurindji people. The strikers initially camped on the Victoria River, but the following year moved to Wattie Creek, traditionally called Daguragu by the Gurindji, and changed their demand to one of return of their traditional lands.

Before the strike, Manning and other union activists had anticipated industrial action at Wave Hill and arranged that in the event of it the Gurindji would send them a telegram. As a waterside worker, Manning was then a member of the North Australian Workers Union (NAWU), the union which also covered pastoral workers. Working with Dexter Daniels, the official NAWU indigenous organiser, Manning arranged the transport of supplies from the union to support the strike, initially at Victoria River, using his Bedford TJ truck.

As Manning recounts it, the initial journey was a difficult sixteen-hour journey on the rough corrugated road, travelling at only fifteen or twenty miles an hour at times and putting stress on the truck and occupants. Meeting with Lingiari and speaking with the strikers, Manning and Daniels promised to support them for the duration of the strike, an undertaking significant as a previous strike by the Gurindji in 1953 had failed through lack of support.

The truck was used in other ways to support the strike, such as transporting others from Hooker Creek to join the action. Manning recounts how his presence was greeted with hostility from a senior Darwin based Welfare Department executive officer and from the local police officer.

Manning used the first visit to organise details of ongoing support. Back in Darwin he organised an ongoing roster using the truck to carry supplies, although he reports that over a dozen or so trips the original timber tray on the truck, "literally shook to pieces". He also worked with the NTCAR to organise wider awareness of and support for the action around the country. He was elected as a delegate to the Waterside Workers Federation’s All Ports Conference in Sydney, where he was instrumental in a decision to levy $1.00 per member nationally to support the Gurindji action.

The Gurindji struggle lasted nine years. In Daguragu the Gurindji petitioned the governor-general, Lord Casey, for return of their land. Although this was refused, they set about establishing a permanent settlement, constructing shelters, planting trees, establishing a vegetable garden and eventually building a store and more substantial housing. In March 1971, the Gurindji formed the Murramulla Gurindji Company to further press their claim. Manning continued to make regular visits of support throughout this period.

The strike highlighted for the wider community the poor conditions and discriminatory conditions under which many indigenous people were forced to live. It also provided impetus to the growing land rights movement Australia wide.

The Whitlam government came to power in 1972 on a platform in support of Aboriginal land rights. On 16 August 1975 Prime Minister Gough Whitlam travelled to Daguragu and, creating a now famous image, symbolically handed soil to Lingiari, transferring leasehold title to the Gurindji people. In 1985 the Minister for Aboriginal Affairs, Clyde Holding presented freehold title. Manning was invited to both ceremonies by the Gurindji people.

== East Timor ==
1974 saw the Carnation Revolution, the overthrow of the longstanding dictatorship in Portugal. This signalled the imminent withdrawal of Portugal from its colony of East Timor, 300 kilometres to the north of Darwin. In 1974 Manning travelled to the territory, establishing links with leaders of the Revolutionary Front for an Independent East Timor (Fretilin). Upon this return he formed the Darwin branch of the Campaign for an Independent East Timor (CIET) with Robert Wesley-Smith and other activists. He visited again as part a trade union delegation in May 1975, travelling the country, learning about Fretilin programs and the situation in East Timor.

Anticipating an Indonesian invasion, Manning and other CIET activists provided Fretilin with a number of radio transceivers in late 1975. When Indonesia invaded East Timor on 7 December 1975, Radio Maubere, as it was called, became the main Fretilin link to the outside world and source of information about the situation in East Timor. It functioned until the capture by the Indonesian military of its Fretilin operator, Alarico Fernandes, in late 1978.

For the first months messages were relayed by Telecom, the state owned telecommunications company, until it was ordered by the government to cease doing so. Manning and other CIET activists also operated a two-way radio communication, but this was confiscated by Telecom on 27 January 1976. Working with CIET activist and fellow communist Denis Freney in Sydney, Manning then organised a series of volunteers to operate a clandestine radio link from bush locations in the following years, changing position on a regular basis to avoid detection. Although a number were caught and charged another was back on the air on each occasion in a short period of time.

To avoid operators from having to compromise their security by returning to Darwin with the received messages, Manning established a secondary receiving post on a property he purchased outside of Darwin, equipped with a professional radio mast. Volunteers would record the Fretilin broadcasts, pass them to Manning who sent them to Freney in Sydney, who in turn transcribed them and sent them on to Fretilin missions in New York and Mozambique. They were also them as the basis of media releases and in the CIET publication East Timor News and the Melbourne based Timor Information Service newsletters. In edition Manning established what he referred to as the “public radio”, using which he would surreptitiously take journalists and others, including Labor MP Ken Fry, to bush locations make contact with and interview Fernandes.

In a period in which Indonesia kept East Timor closed to the outside world the radio link provided information on ongoing Fretilin resistance and the very serious humanitarian and human rights situation during the Indonesian invasion and occupation.

Manning continued his activism for an independent East Timor during the 1980s and 1990s.

He attended Fretilin Congress in independent Timor-Leste in 2011 where he was applauded by Fretilin members for his activism in support of independence.

== Trade unionist ==
Manning was several times secretary of the Darwin branch of the Waterside Workers Federation. He was founding secretary of the Northern Territory Trades and Labour Council. Manning was on the Board of Inquiry that in 1984 laid the foundations for worker’s compensation for Territorians.

== Later years ==
Manning sat on the Darwin Hospital Advisory Board and the Education Advisory Council. He held a number of positions, including supervisor and secretary of the Board of Crisis Line and president of Stuart Park Primary School Council. After his retirement at 69 he became honorary president of the Darwin Port Welfare Committee, which established a Seafarers Centre at the East Arm Port in Darwin.

== The truck ==
In 2010, Manning's Bedford truck, which he used to support the Wave Hill strikers in the 1960s, was listed in the Northern Territory Government Heritage Register.

The truck was also used in support of the Radio Maubere link in the 1970s.

In 2016, the National Museum of Australia in Canberra announced it would be acquiring the truck to become an exhibit in the museum.

== Awards ==
Manning was awarded Darwin Citizen of the Year in 2010.

In 2010, Manning was the state finalist for national Senior Australian of the Year.

Manning was made a lifetime member of the Maritime Union of Australia.

In 2014, Manning was posthumously awarded the Collar of the Order of Timor-Leste.
