= Aboriginal land trust =

Type of Australian non-profit organisation

In Australia, an Aboriginal land trust (ALT) is a type of non-profit organisation that holds the freehold title to an area of land on behalf of a community of Aboriginal Australians. The land has been legally granted to a community by the government under a perpetual lease, usually after the community makes a formal claim of traditional ownership. Land granted under Aboriginal title is inalienable; it can not be bought, sold, traded or given away. The land trust is the organisation appointed by the community to legally hold the title deeds. The land trusts are administered by Aboriginal land councils.

== Establishment and operation of Aboriginal land trusts ==
Several states and territories have enacted laws to establish Aboriginal land trusts, but not all.

=== New South Wales ===
An Aboriginal Lands Trust existed in New South Wales in the 1960s and into the 1970s, a body of which Lyall Munro Snr was a member, among others. This organisation had land passed to it by the government as well as having some bequeathed to it in private individuals' wills. They were successful in winning various rights over land in various places, including hunting and fishing rights, without having to go to court. They were instrumental in the closing down of Kinchela Boys' Home (1970) and Cootamundra Girls' Home (1974). They also encouraged young people to be initiated into their peoples' cultures.

The Aboriginal Lands Trust of New South Wales (or New South Wales Aboriginal Lands Trust) existed from 1974 to 1983. It was established by the Aborigines (Amendment) Act 1973, and comprised all members of the Aborigines Advisory Council. The Advisory Council consisted of nine Aboriginal people who had been elected by the people to represent Aboriginal people of a particular area of the state, for a three-year term. The inaugural meeting of the Trust took place on 5 February 1974, and it continued to meet monthly in Sydney or elsewhere in NSW. The Trust reported to the Minister, and was independently funded, with its own administrator, staff, and premises. It had corporate ownership of all Aboriginal reserves in NSW "on behalf of and for the benefit of Aboriginal people", which included freehold title of existing reserves as well as the mineral rights to the land. The Trust was responsible for houses located on the reserves, and was free to do anything with the land so long as it served the community. Members in 1977–79 included George Griffiths, Bill Cohen, Charlie Leon, Lyall Munro, Ossie Cruse (chairman), Ron Riley, Essie Coffey, and Henry Bolt. This was "the first all-Aboriginal democratically elected statutory body to own freehold title to Aboriginal land in Australia", according to Sue Norman (2011).

A non-statutory NSW Aboriginal Land Council was created in 1977, to assist in the protests by Aboriginal people for their land rights.

In February 1982 the NSW Government informed the Aboriginal Lands Trust that the Minister for Aboriginal Affairs, Frank Walker would be responsible for matters relating to it, and that Pat O'Shane had been appointed Secretary to the Minister. Protests ensued, but Aboriginal Land Rights Act 1983 created the NSWALC as a statutory body. This was considered a backwards step by members of the Aboriginal Lands Trust, because significant lands, hunting and gathering rights, and other rights were lost in the new Act. The property of the Trust was transferred to the Minister, until its eventual transfer to relevant Aboriginal Land Councils.

=== Northern Territory ===
In the Northern Territory, land trusts are governed under the Aboriginal Land Rights Act, 1976, which also governs the way in which groups can make claims to land. The ALTs hold the title to land handed back to the traditional Aboriginal owners through the Land Rights Act.

=== Queensland ===
In Queensland, there are many land trusts, holding about 5% of the land. They were created under the state's Aboriginal Land Act 1991 and the Torres Strait Islander Land Act 1991.

=== South Australia ===
In South Australia, there is a single statutory body known as the Aboriginal Lands Trust, also known as the South Australian Aboriginal Lands Trust (SAALT). It was created under the Aboriginal Lands Trust Act 1966. This Bill was introduced by Don Dunstan, who was then South Australia's Attorney-General and Minister for Aboriginal Affairs, and who later became Premier. It holds title to Aboriginal land in South Australia and oversees the management and control of those lands including the ability to issue a lease over lands for 99 years to an "incorporated community body". The Government of South Australia is also able to transfer other crown land to the control of the Trust.

The Lands Trust Act 1966 was the first land rights law in modern times and predated the 1967 Referendum. It allowed for parcels of Aboriginal land previously held by the South Australian Government to be handed to the Aboriginal Lands Trust of SA under the Act. It was held in perpetuity for the benefit of Aboriginal South Australians. The Trust was governed by a Board composed solely of Aboriginal people. In the 2013 Review of the Act, the powers of the Trust were reviewed and changed to modernise the Trust and the Aboriginal Lands Trust of South Australia Act 2013 (SA) was passed.

The other two Aboriginal landholding authorities in the state are Anangu Pitjantjatjara Yankunytjatjara (APY) and Maralinga Tjarutja, also statutory bodies.

=== Western Australia ===
The Aboriginal Lands Trust in Western Australia was created by the Aboriginal Affairs Planning Authority Act 1972. It acquires and holds land and manages it for the benefit of Aboriginal communities. It holds about 27 million hectares (67×10^{6} acres) (11%) of the state's land, most of which was previously held by the state government.

== See also ==
- Australian Indigenous advisory bodies
