= Dexter Daniels (Aboriginal activist) =

Aboriginal Australian activist

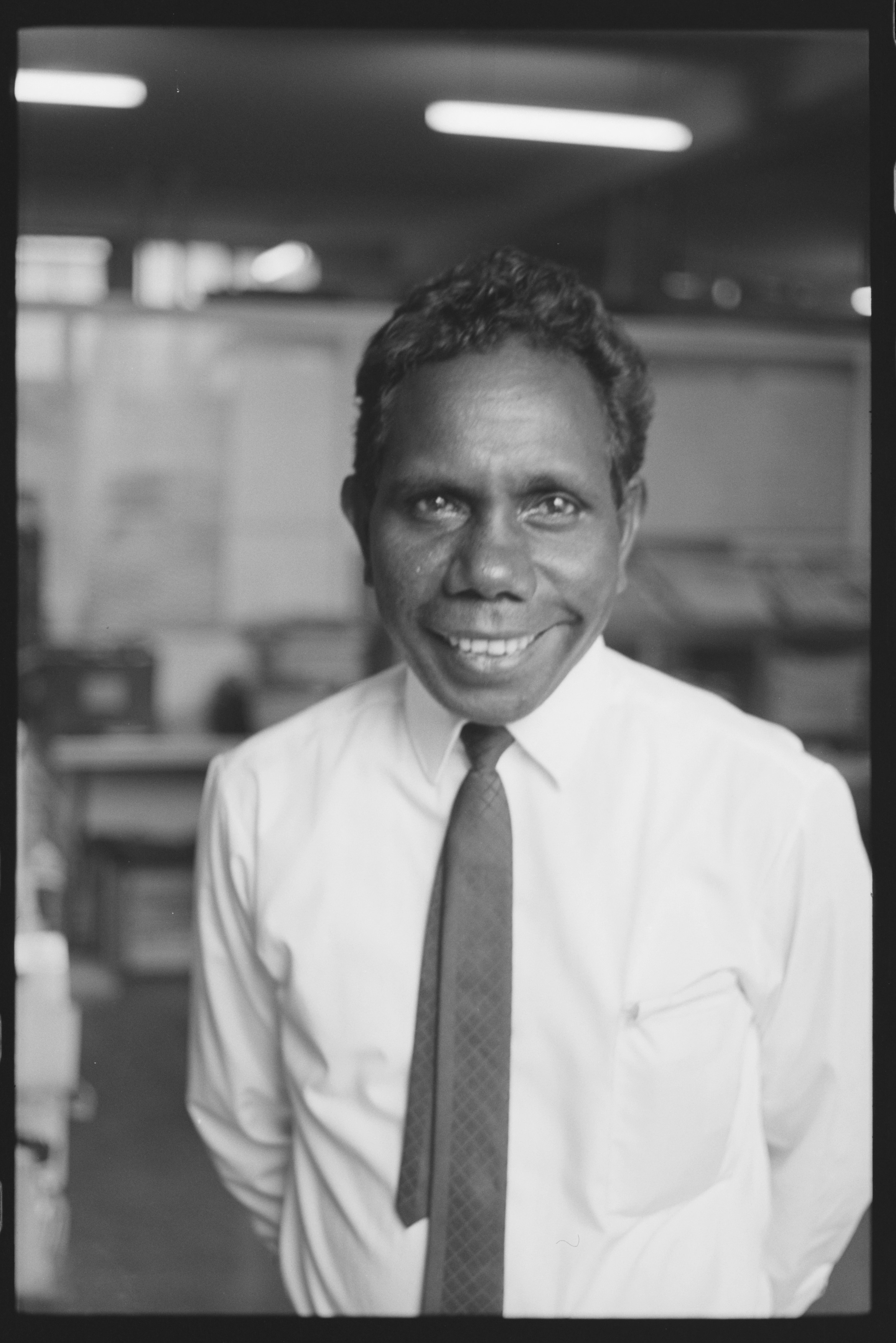
Dexter Daniels, 1968

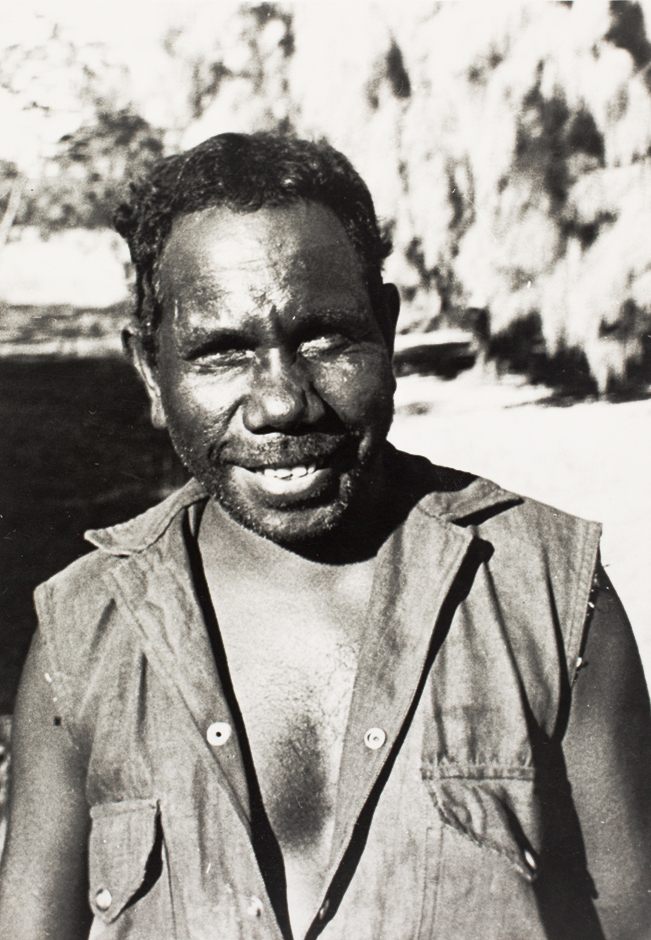
Dexter Daniels, 1970

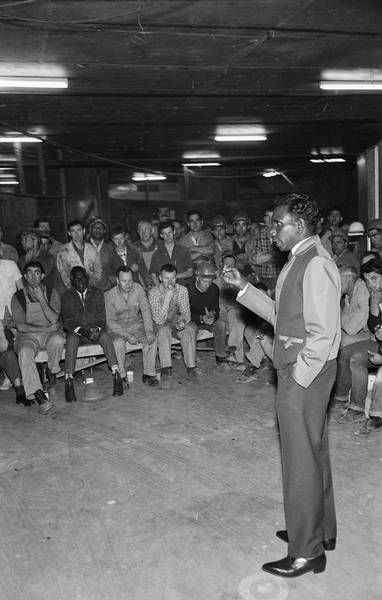
Dexter Daniels addressing Sydney unionists, October 1966

Dexter Daniels or Nubuluna (c. 1936 – 24 December 1999) was a Numamurdirdi (Yugul Mangi) man from south-east Arnhem Land and pioneering activist in the struggle for Aboriginal rights and land rights in Australia during the 1960s and 1970s. Daniels came to public attention as the breakaway Aboriginal Organiser of the North Australian Workers' Union (NAWU) in 1966 and was integral in supporting the Wave Hill walk-off.

== Early life ==
Daniels was born at the Roper River Mission in the Northern Territory of Australia. This was run by the Church Mission Society. He was the son of Ukamangara (known as Debra) and Jangridpa (known as Dan) and he was one of seven children. His mother worked at the mission and he attended school there; as policy dictated Daniels was required to live in a dormitory, separate to his parents.

After completing his schooling Daniels worked as a stockman at Oenpelli Mission and then moved to Darwin where he worked at the airport washing planes and then as an orderly at Darwin Hospital. In 1962 he married Ruth Wurramara (Wardunggu) and they had one daughter named Muriel.

In late 1964 he travelled to Kenya with Phillip Waipuldanya Roberts to study their move for independence and this trip deeply influenced him and fed into a strong vision for Aboriginal equality and sovereignty. Following this trip, in 1965, he began working as an Aboriginal Organiser of the North Australian Workers' Union.

Daniels was one of many Indigenous activists from the Roper Mission who went on to become deeply involved in social and political struggles in the Northern Territory. They included the Roberts brothers, Clancy, Jacob and Phillip and Dexter Daniels and his brother Davis. "That's not right" was a response of which Daniels was "very fond" when discussing injustices.

== The Wave Hill walk-off ==
Wave Hill Station is a pastoral station which was run by British pastoral company Vesteys. It employed many local Aboriginal people, mostly Gurindji. Conditions on the station for Aboriginal people were very poor. Their wages were not equal to those paid to non-Aboriginal employees and were often controlled. While an effort to introduce equal wages for Aboriginal workers was made in 1965, the Conciliation and Arbitration Commission decided to delay the payment of award wages for Aboriginal people in the cattle industry until 1968.

Spurred into action by this delay, Daniels sought backing from NAWU to support a strike by Aboriginal pastoral workers across the Northern Territory. His preliminary contact with workers in the Barkly Tablelands of the Territory resulted in Aboriginal workers leaving Newcastle Waters and Helen Springs cattle stations in April 1966. NAWU's Northern Territory Secretary Paddy Carroll refused to support a territory-wide strike on practical grounds, however. Daniels then sought and obtained backing from the Northern Territory Council of Aboriginal Rights, and travelled to Wave Hill Station with Communist and Waterside Worker Brian Manning and Tiwi actor Robert Tudawali. The support offered by Daniels and the NTCAR to Vincent Lingiari, leader of the Gurindji people, encouraged Lingiari to undertake the protest action that became known as the Wave Hill walk-off, on 23 August 1966.

The 1973 documentary film The Unlucky Australians by British director John Goldschmidt featured Daniels in a reconstruction of the Wave Hill walk-off. The film was narrated by Frank Hardy, who had championed the Gurindji cause.

== General activism ==
After the Wave Hill Walk-off, Daniels travelled to Sydney on a speaking tour with Gurindji elder Lupngagiari (Captain Major). His advocacy and confidence quickly made Daniels a well-known and controversial figure among NT pastoralists and conservative politicians. In 1967, Daniels was arrested upon his return to his home community on a vagrancy charge. The charge was subsequently shown to have no basis and was dismissed.

During the later 1960s and early 1970s, Daniels again traveled interstate, leading numerous demonstrations and speaking at rallies for Aboriginal Land Rights in Sydney and Melbourne. Daniels lobbied for the land rights of his own and neighbouring clans also.

In April 1968, Daniels was arrested for vagrancy and sentenced to 14 days jail. He appealed the conviction and won. In July the same year, Dexter attended the World Youth Festival in Sofia, Bulgaria as a guest of the Communist Party of Australia.

After the award of a pastoral lease to the Gurindji people in 1973, he lived among them at Kalkaringi in 1975–76. Land rights over his own country was awarded automatically as an existing Aboriginal reserve by the Whitlam government.

== Later life ==
In his later years Daniels lived at Bagot Aboriginal Reserve before returning to live at Ngukurr in 1988. He died on 24 December 1999 in Katherine.
