= Letters Patent establishing the Province of South Australia =

1836 application to King William IV

The Letters Patent establishing the Province of South Australia, dated 19 February 1836 and formally titled "Letters Patent under the Great Seal of the United Kingdom erecting and establishing the Province of South Australia and fixing the boundaries thereof", was presented to King William IV to formally seek the approval to establish the Province of South Australia. It defined the boundaries of the new colony, but also, significantly and unlike the South Australia Act 1834, included recognition of the rights of the Aboriginal peoples of South Australia. It is sometimes referred to as Letters Patent 1836.

== History ==
The South Australia Act 1834 legislated for the establishment of a settlement in South Australia, but did not provide specific directions with regard to how the Province of South Australia was to be founded, which these Letters Patent, formulated by the Colonisation Commissioners for South Australia, supplied. The main change to the 1834 Act was to amend the wording referring to the land as "unoccupied", and offer recognition of the rights of the "Aboriginal Natives" to live unhindered within the lands of the Province of South Australia.

These Letters Patent, dated 19 February 1836, were presented to King William IV to formally seek the approval to establish the Province of South Australia, and on 23 February 1836, an Order-in-Council provided authority for the establishment of government in the Province of South Australia. The Order-in-Council provided for a governing Council comprising the Governor, the Judge or Chief Justice, the Colonial Secretary, the Advocate-General and the Resident Commissioner, with broad legislative and executive powers including the imposition of rates, duties, and taxes.

However, laws could only be proposed by the Governor and were subject to approval or disallowance by the King as advised by the Imperial Government. The Order-in-Council again expressly protected the rights of "Aboriginal natives".

== Description ==
The Letters Patent, long title "Letters Patent under the Great Seal of the United Kingdom erecting and establishing the Province of South Australia and fixing the boundaries thereof", defined the boundaries of the Province of South Australia:

On the North the twenty sixth Degree of South Latitude — On the South the Southern Ocean — On the West the one hundred and thirty second Degree of East Longitude — And on the East the one hundred and forty first Degree of East Longitude including therein all and every the Bays and Gulfs thereof together with the Island called Kangaroo Island and all and every the Islands adjacent to the said last mentioned Island or to that part of the main Land of the said Province.

The Letters Patent included a recognition of the rights of the "Aboriginal Natives" to live within the lands of the Province of South Australia:

Provided Always that nothing in those our Letters Patent contained shall affect or be construed to affect the rights of any Aboriginal Natives of the said Province to the actual occupation or enjoyment in their own Persons or in the Persons of their Descendants of any Lands therein now actually occupied or enjoyed by such Natives.

This differed from the statements of the South Australia Act 1834 (4 & 5 Will. 4. c. 95), which described the lands as "waste" and "unoccupied". An amendment to the 1834 act (the South Australia Government Act 1838 (1 & 2 Vict. c. 60), passed 31 July 1838) incorporated the changes.

== Afterwards ==
The first migrant ship, the John Pirie, set sail for the colony three days later. On 28 December 1836, Governor Hindmarsh issued a Proclamation of the new Province at Glenelg.

On 31 July 1838, the changes were brought into law by "An act to amend an act of the fourth and fifth years of his late majesty empowering his majesty to erect South Australia into a British province or provinces" (short name ascribed by the National Library of Australia: South Australia Government Act 1838 (1 & 2 Vict. c. 60).

== Significance to Aboriginal people ==
As colonisation proceeded, no heed was paid to the words of the Letters Patent about Aboriginal rights to land: there were no treaties signed; colonists bought, leased and were granted land, thus effectively dispossessing the original inhabitants of their land.

In 1966, Premier Don Dunstan passed the Aboriginal Lands Trust Act 1966 on the basis of the unfulfilled Letters Patent, which gave rights to Aboriginal people over their land (the rights in the letters patent were later enshrined in the South Australia Government Act 1838 (1 & 2 Vict. c. 60)).

The Letters Patent were cited in the Milirrpum v Nabalco Pty Ltd (a.k.a. Gove land rights case), lodged in 1968 and decided in 1971, by the plaintiffs, the Yolngu people of the Gove Peninsula, Arnhem Land, Northern Territory, in their bid to claim rights over their traditional lands. They were unsuccessful in their claim, but not long afterwards, the Aboriginal Land Rights Act 1976 (NT) was passed, leading to the recognition of native title in the territory.

From the early 21st century, research focused on the potential legal implications of this disregard of the Letters, and the document again became a source of debate.

On Proclamation Day in 2006, the then SA Minister for Aboriginal Affairs, Jay Weatherill, acknowledged publicly that the failure of the state to have met the Letters' promise 170 years later has "been the cause of much loss and suffering for Aboriginal people". On 24 April 2007 the Australian Democrats MLC, Sandra Kanck, and Greens MLC, Mark Parnell, on the occasion of the Sesquicentenary (150 years) of Responsible Government in South Australia referred to the Letters Patent when they read a statement authorised by the Aboriginal Alliance Coalition Movement in Parliament, "asking you to acknowledge that your enjoyment, if not the spirit, of your commemorative congratulations, blindly overlooks the denial of our English land rights within our own country in establishing your parliament on the land of the traditional owners and on the country of their unacknowledged descendants".

The 175th anniversary of the Letters Patent was commemorated at the Living Kaurna Cultural Centre at Warriparinga on 19 February 2011, as a document which preserves the rights of the Aboriginal inhabitants.

The 2014 film King's Seal tells of the struggle for recognition of rights that were granted by the Letters Patent.

=== 2018 Kaurna native title agreement ===
On 21 March 2018, a native title agreement between Kaurna elders, the State Government and the Commonwealth was formally accepted in a judgement in the Federal Court, 18 years after the original claim was lodged. The judgement recognises Kaurna people's native title rights over 17 parcels of undeveloped land not under freehold, and extends from Gulf St Vincent to the Mt Lofty Ranges, from Myponga Beach in the south to Redhill in the north, and includes Adelaide's metropolitan area. The Kaurna people were also recognised as the traditional owners of the Adelaide Plains.

== See also ==
- Aboriginal land rights in Australia
- Aboriginal Lands Trust Act 1966
- British colonisation of South Australia
- Native title in Australia
- South Australia–Victoria border dispute

== Sources ==
- Transcript of Letters Patent establishing the Province of South Australia 19 February 1836 (UK), National Archives of Australia
