= Dexter Daniels =

Dexter Daniels may refer to:

- Dexter Daniels (American football) (1973–), American football linebacker
- Dexter Daniels (Aboriginal activist) (1932–c. 1990), Australian Aboriginal activist
