= The Yarns of Billy Borker =

- Written by: Frank Hardy
- Starring: Peter Carver
- Country of origin: Australia
- Original language: English

Production
- Running time: 5-10 minutes

Original release
- Network: ABC Television
- Release: 14 September 1964 – 15 February 1965

The Yarns of Billy Borker is an Australian TV series for the ABC based on scripts by Frank Hardy, which aired from 14 February 1964 until 15 February 1965. They consisted of five-minute episodes of stories written by Hardy and told by Peter Carver. It was shot in Perth.

Hardy later turned these into a book and an album.

The show was replaced with another similar one called Under the Morning Star.
