= List of laws concerning Indigenous Australians =

A range of laws applying to or of specific relevance to Indigenous Australians. A number of laws have been passed since the European settlement of Australia, initially by the Parliament of the United Kingdom, then by the Governors or legislature of each of the Australian colonies and more recently by the Parliament of Australia and that of each of its States and Territories, these laws, arranged chronologically, include:

Title	Jurisdiction	Focus	Notes
Aboriginals Fire Arm Regulation Act 1840	New South Wales	Control	
Aboriginal Orphans Act 1844	South Australia	Control	
Aboriginal Witnesses Act	South Australia	Control	
Supply of Liquors to Aborigines Prevention Act 1867	New South Wales	Control	
Aboriginal Protection Act 1869	Victoria (colonial)	Control	
Aborigines Protection Act 1886 (WA)	Western Australia	Control	
Half-Caste Act 1886 (Vic)	Victoria	Control	
Half-Caste Act 1886 (WA)	Western Australia	Control	
Act to provide certain matters connected with the Aborigines 1889 (statute 24/1889)	Western Australia	Control	
Aboriginal Protection and restriction of the sale of opium act 1897	Queensland	Control	
Aborigines Protection Act 1909	New South Wales	Control	
Aborigines Act 1910	Victoria		
Aborigines Act 1911	South Australia	Control	
Aborigines (Training of Children) Act 1923	South Australia	Control	
Aborigines Act 1934	South Australia	Control	
Aborigines Protection (Amendment) Act 1940	New South Wales	Control	
Pitjantjatjara Lands Act 1956	South Australia	First native title legislation in the country	
Aboriginal Affairs Act 1962	South Australia	Control	
Aboriginal Lands Trust Act 1966	South Australia	Land rights	
Aborigines Act 1969 (NSW)	New South Wales	Control	
Aboriginal Lands Act 1970	Victoria	Land rights	
Aboriginal Affairs (Arrangements with the States) Act 1973	Commonwealth of Australia	Inter-governmental administration	
National Parks and Wildlife Act 1974 (NSW)	New South Wales	Heritage	
Aboriginal Relics Act 1975 (No. 81 of 1975)	Tasmania	Heritage protection	
Aboriginal Land Rights Act 1976	Commonwealth of Australia	Land rights	
Anangu Pitjantjatjara Yankunytjatjara Land Rights Act, 1981	South Australia	Land rights	
Maralinga Tjarutja Land Rights Act 1984	South Australia	Land rights	
Aboriginal Heritage Act 1988 (SA)	South Australia	Heritage	
Aboriginal and Torres Strait Islander Commission Act 1989	Commonwealth	Control	
Native Title Act 1993	Commonwealth	Native title	
Native Title (South Australia) Act 1994	South Australia	Native title	
Aboriginal Lands Act 1995	Tasmania	Land rights	
Living Marine Resources Management Act 1995 (No. 25 of 1995)	Tasmania	Protection	
Hindmarsh Island Bridge Act 1996	Commonwealth	Development	
Native Title Amendment Act 1998	Commonwealth	Native title	
Burial and Cremation Act 2002 (No. 4 of 2002)	Tasmania	Control	
National Parks and Reserves Management Act 2002 (No. 62 of 2002)	Tasmania	Protection and Control	
Nature Conservation Act 2002 (No. 63 of 2002)	Tasmania	Protection	
Aboriginal Lands Parliamentary Standing Committee Act 2003	South Australia	Land rights	
Aboriginal Cultural Heritage Act 2003 (Qld)	Queensland	Heritage	
Commission of Inquiry (Children in State Care and Children on APY Lands) Act 2004	South Australia	Investigatory/ Child protection	
Aboriginal Land Council Elections Act 2004	Tasmania	Elections	
Aboriginal Heritage Act 2006	Victoria	Heritage	
Stolen Generations of Aboriginal Children Act 2006	Tasmania	Compensation for people of the Stolen Generations	
Northern Territory National Emergency Response Act 2007 (No. 129, 2007)	Commonwealth	Land control, protection, Control	

== See also ==
- Aboriginal Land Rights Act 1976
- History of Indigenous Australians
- Native title in Australia
- Native title legislation in Australia
