= Vincent Lingiari =

Aboriginal Australian rights activist (born 1908)

Vincent Lingiari AM
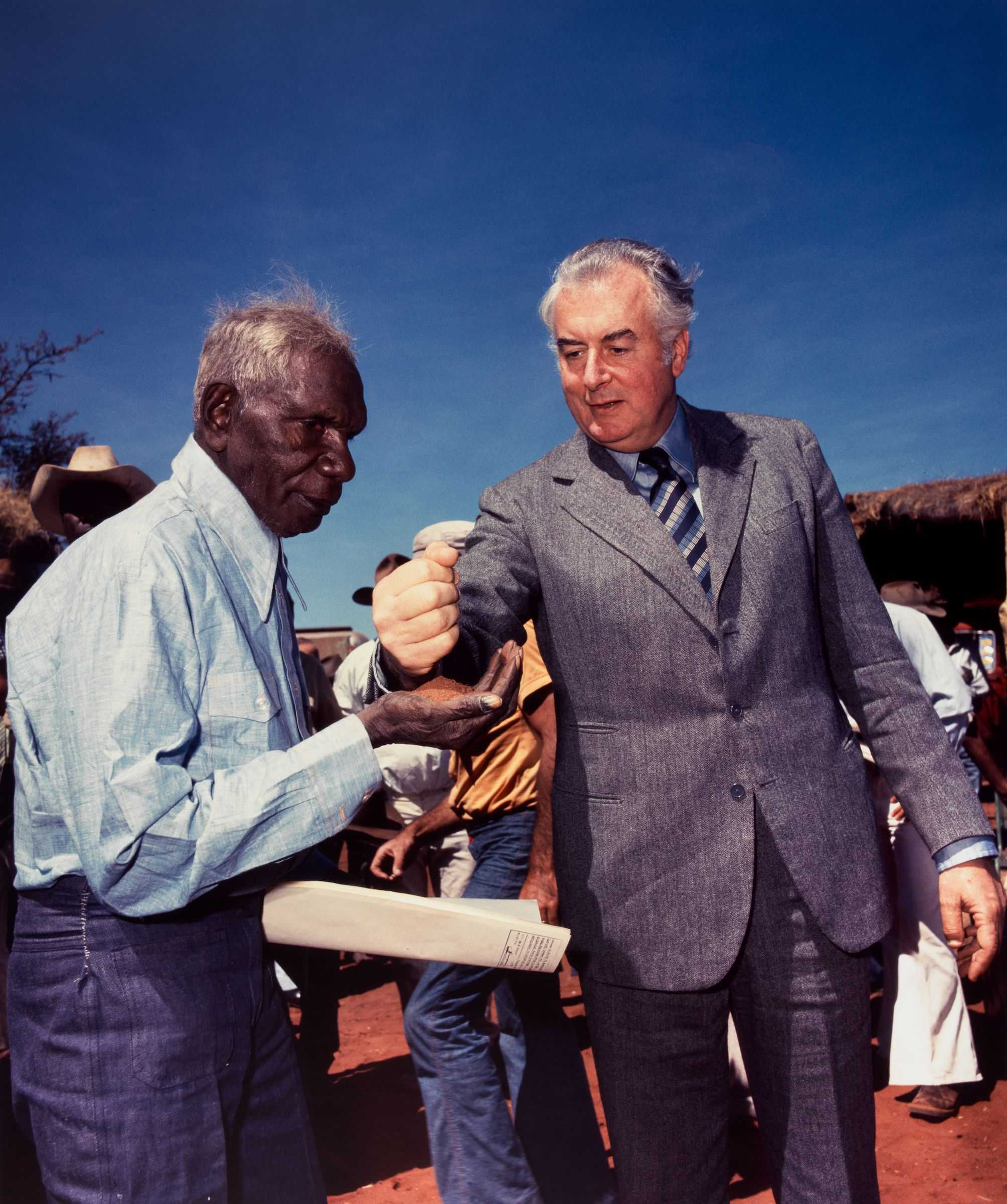
- Lingiari with Gough Whitlam in 1975
- Born: 13 June 1908 or 1919; Victoria River Gorge, Northern Territory, Australia
- Died: 21 January 1988; Daguragu, Northern Territory, Australia
- Occupation: Stockman at Wave Hill Station
- Years active: 1930s−1987
- Known for: Aboriginal rights activist Wave Hill walk-off
- Spouse: Blanche Nangi
- Children: 8
- Awards: Order of Australia

Vincent Lingiari AM (/lɪŋdʒɪjɑːri/; 13 June 1908 or 1919 – 21 January 1988) was an Australian Aboriginal rights activist of the Gurindji people. In his early life he started as a stockman at Wave Hill Station, where the Aboriginal workers were given beef, bread, and tobacco as their wages of $6. After the owners of the station refused to improve pay and working conditions at the cattle station and hand back some of Gurindji land, Lingiari was elected and became the leader of the workers in August 1966. He led his people in the Wave Hill walk-off, also known as the Gurindji strike.

On 7 June 1976, Lingiari was named a Member of the Order of Australia for his services to the Aboriginal people. The story of Lingiari is celebrated in the Paul Kelly and Kev Carmody song "From Little Things Big Things Grow".

== Early life ==
Vincent Lingiari was born in 1919, according to Australian Government records, but some sources allege his date of birth was actually 13 June 1908. He became a poorly-remunerated stockman at Wave Hill Station when he was a young man.

== Wave Hill walk-off ==
Wave Hill Cattle Station is located approximately 600 km south of 5/6E Darwin in the Northern Territory. From the late 19th century it was run by the British pastoral company Vesteys. Vesteys employed the local Indigenous people, the Gurindji, to work on Wave Hill. But working conditions were extremely poor and wages were very low when compared to those of non-Indigenous employees.

In 1966, Lingiari, a member of the Gurindji, worked at Wave Hill and had recently returned from a period of hospitalization in Darwin and led a walk-off of indigenous employees of Wave Hill as a protest against the work and conditions. The strike lasted for seven years straight. While there had been complaints from Indigenous employees about conditions on Wave Hill over many years, including an inquiry during the 1930s that was critical of Vestey's employment practices, the walk-off had a focus that was aimed at a wider target than Vestey's. Before 1968 it was illegal to pay an Indigenous worker more than a specified amount in goods and money. In many cases, the government benefits for which Indigenous employees were eligible were paid into pastoral companies' accounts, rather than to the individuals.

The protesters established the Wattie Creek (Daguragu) camp and demanded the return of some of their traditional lands. Speaking on this Lingiari said, "We want to live on our land, our way". So began the eight-year fight by the Gurindji people to obtain title to their land.

In 1969, Lingiari co-wrote the song "Gurindji Blues", with Ted Egan. Sung by Galarrwuy Yunupingu, the song was recorded and released in 1971.

== Land rights act and handback ==
The Wave Hill strike would eventually reshape the agenda of relationships between Indigenous Australians and the wider community. Although initially an employee-rights action, it soon became a major federal issue when the Gurindji people demanded the return of their traditional lands.

The strike lasted seven years. Over that time, support for Aboriginal land rights grew as the struggle intensified. The protest eventually led to the Aboriginal Land Rights (Northern Territory) Act 1976. This act was the basis by which Aboriginal Australian and Torres Strait Islander people could apply for freehold title to traditional lands (known as Native title in Australia) in the Northern Territory and, significantly, the power to negotiate over mining and development on those lands, including what type of compensation they would like.

An important and symbolic event in Australian history occurred when, during an emotional ceremony in 1975, Prime Minister Gough Whitlam poured the local sand into Lingiari's hands, symbolically handing a small part of land belonging to the Wave Hill station back to the Gurindji people, on a 30-year pastoral lease. A photograph of the moment captured by Mervyn Bishop was purchased by the National Portrait Gallery and is displayed in Old Parliament House.

On 7 June 1976, Lingiari was named a Member of the Order of Australia for his services to the Aboriginal people.

== Death and legacy ==
Lingiari died on 21 January 1988. Every year until then he attended the Gurindji's annual re-enactment of the walk-off.

Lingiari was a leader and holder of the cultural authority of the Gurindji people. His fight for his people's rights made him a national figure. He won a victory that is one of the most outstanding achievements in the history of the struggle for the recognition of Indigenous people, and initiated awareness to non-Indigenous people of the intense connections between Indigenous peoples and their land.

One of Australia's largest electorates is named after Lingiari. The Division of Lingiari encompasses nearly all of the Northern Territory as well as Christmas Island and the Cocos Islands. It includes Daguragu and traditional Gurindji lands.

The story of Lingiari is celebrated in the song "From Little Things Big Things Grow" written by Paul Kelly and Indigenous musician Kev Carmody and recorded by Kelly in 1991. It was later added to the Sounds of Australia archive.

The Vincent Lingiari Memorial Lectures have been held at the Casuarina campus amphitheatre of Charles Darwin University since 1996, featuring speakers as diverse as Gough Whitlam, Marcia Langton, Malcolm Fraser, Pat Dodson and Bruce Pascoe.

The Lingiari Foundation was established in 2001, "to promote reconciliation and to develop Aboriginal leadership", chaired by Pat Dodson until it dissolved in 2016. The foundation donated a portrait of Dodson painted by Melbourne-based artist Zhou Xiaoping, to the National Portrait Gallery in Canberra.

The story of his part in the strike is also told in Irish folk musician Damien Dempsey's song "Wave Hill Walk Off", on his 2016 album No Force on Earth.

The Vincent Lingiari Cup, is an Aussie rules football competition that takes place at the annual Freedom Day Festival each year in Kalkaringi.

=== Vincent Lingiari Art Award ===
The Vincent Lingiari Art Award was created in 2016 by the Central Land Council (CLC) and Desart, on the 50th anniversary of the Gurindji strike, and 40 years after the Land Rights Act was passed. CLC is the land council for Central Australia, while Desart represents over 40 Aboriginal art centres in the region. The award intentionally has a political focus, in particular relating to land and water rights for Aboriginal people. The submissions, open to all members of Desart-affilieated art centres as well as artists with strong links to the CLC region, are displayed at the Tangentyere Artists Gallery (run by Tangentyere Council) in Alice Springs. The award is the first art prize in the region developed by Aboriginal organisations.

In 2016, the theme of the competition was "Our Land, Our Life, Our Future", and the inaugural award, judged by Hetti Perkins, was won by Marlene Rubuntja of Alice Springs, for her soft sculpture My future is in my hands. The award was worth A$15,000 in this year.

In 2019 the award theme was "Our Country – True Story", relating to the call for truth-telling which was made in the 2017 Uluru Statement from the Heart, and the submissions were exhibited from 4 September at the Tangentyere Artists Gallery. The prize went to Eunice Napanangka Jack of Ikuntji Artists for her painting titled Kuruyultu, which is the name of the artist's birthplace, and the painting expresses her connection to it.

In 2021, the theme was water rights, expressed as "Ngawa, Ngapa, Kapi, Kwatja, Water", intended to "raise awareness of our struggle against massive water theft that threatens the survival of desert plants, animals and people and for safe drinking water for our remote communities", according to the CEO of Desart, Philip Watkins. The award paintings were exhibited from 8 September at the Tangentyere Artists Gallery, and a second award was also introduced, the Delegates Choice Award. Judge Hetti Perkins selected the painting Raining at Laramba, by Grace Kemarre Robinya (born 1942) of Tangentyere Artists as the winner. The title refers to the small community of Laramba, near Napperby Station, where Robinya used to live, where the water supply contains three times the level of uranium considered to be the safe limit. The Delegates' Choice Award went to Leah Leaman for her painting titled Following the Waterways. There were a record 47 entries for the A$10,000 award.

== See also ==
- Native title in Australia
- List of Indigenous Australian historical figures
