= Aboriginal Lands Trust Act 1966 =

Act of the Parliament of South Australia

Parliament of South Australia
- Long title: An Act to establish an Aboriginal Lands Trust, to define the powers and functions thereof, for purposes incidental thereto and for other purposes (No. 87 of 1966).
- Citation: Aboriginal Lands Trust Act, 1966
- Enacted by: Parliament of South Australia
- Enacted: 8 December 1966

Repeals
- 1 July 2014

Related legislation
- Sch 1 cl 6 of Aboriginal Lands Trust Act 2013
- Status: Repealed

The Aboriginal Lands Trust Act 1966 is the short title of an Act of the Parliament of South Australia, assented to on 8 December 1966, with the long title "An Act to establish an Aboriginal Lands Trust, to define the powers and functions thereof, for purposes incidental thereto and for other purposes". This Bill was introduced by Don Dunstan, who was then South Australia's Attorney-General and Minister for Aboriginal Affairs, and who later became Premier.

This Act signified the first major recognition of Aboriginal land rights by any Australian government. It also marked a return to promises made in the Letters Patent establishing the Province of South Australia in 1836, by establishing a land trust which would hold the title to and assume management of all the existing Aboriginal reserves in South Australia, for the benefit of the Aboriginal people. The Governor of South Australia assented to the new law on 8 December 1966.

The Act established the South Australian Aboriginal Lands Trust.

The Act was repealed by the Schedule 1, Clause 6 of Aboriginal Lands Trust Act 2013 on 1 July 2014.

== See also ==
- British colonisation of South Australia
- Terra nullius § Australia
