= Aboriginal Land Rights Commission =

Enquiry into Aboriginal land rights

The Aboriginal Land Rights Commission, also known as the Woodward Royal Commission, was a royal commission that existed from 1973 to 1974 with the purpose to inquire into appropriate ways to recognise Aboriginal land rights in the Northern Territory of Australia. The commission was chaired by Justice Edward Woodward, who was appointed to the role by Gough Whitlam. It was not long after the 1971 defeat of the Yolngu claimants in the Northern Territory Supreme Court, in Milirrpum v Nabalco Pty Ltd, in the first Aboriginal land rights case in Australia.

== History ==
After the defeat of the Aboriginal plaintiffs in Milirrpum v Nabalco Pty Ltd, the first Aboriginal land rights case in Australia, a deliberate decision to pursue a political course rather than legal challenge to the High Court of Australia was taken by the lawyers, one of whom was Edward Woodward. At the time, the membership of the Court was likely to reject Justice Blackburn's finding that there was a coherent system of Aboriginal law relating to land. By not having the appeal rejected by the High Court, the findings of Justice Blackburn that were favourable to the plaintiffs (and by extension to other Aboriginal Australian peoples, and the concept of land rights was maintained as a possibility, at least until the membership of the High Court had changed.

In 1972 at the launch of his party's election campaign, Gough Whitlam, as Labor Opposition Leader, promised if elected to legislate for Aboriginal land rights in the Northern Territory of Australia. When elected, rather than introduce a national land rights law, the Whitlam government chose instead to establish a precedent in the Commonwealth controlled Northern Territory.

Justice Woodward was appointed as Aboriginal Land Rights Commissioner in February 1973 to inquire into appropriate ways to recognise Aboriginal land rights in the Northern Territory. The Northern Land Council and Central Land Council were established in the same year to assist with the work of the commission.

== The Royal Commission ==
The Aboriginal Land Rights Commission produced two reports. The first report, issued during July 1973, recommended the Australian Government to assist Aboriginal Australians to set up land councils. In August 1973, the Second Whitlam Ministry accepted the findings of the first report and authorised the Minister for Aboriginal Affairs, then Gordon Bryant, to convene the two proposed Aboriginal Land Councils as soon as possible.

Woodward's second and final report as Aboriginal Land Rights Commissioner, presented to the Australian Government in April 1974 was based on the land councils' submissions. The 1974 report found:

- That all Aboriginal reserve lands should be returned to the Aboriginal inhabitants
- That Aboriginal Australians had claim to other vacant crown land if they could prove traditional ties with the land
- That Aboriginal land and Aboriginal sacred sites were to be protected
- That Aboriginal land and Aboriginal land councils were to be set up to administer Aboriginal land
- That entry to Aboriginal land for mining or tourism would be subject to Aboriginal control
- That mining and other developments on Aboriginal land should proceed only with the permission of the Aboriginal land owners
- That if mining companies were allowed to go ahead and mine in Aboriginal lands, the mining companies would be required to pay royalties to the traditional land owners

The Whitlam Labor Government supported the findings of the second report of the Royal Commission and in a gesture of peace handed over the allotted land to the Gurindji people to defuse the Wave Hill protest, in August 1975.

In 1976, the Fraser Government passed The Aboriginal Land Rights Act that allowed Aboriginal people in the Northern Territory to make claims on land to which they could prove traditional ties. The Land Rights Act is largely the product of Justice Woodward's recommendations.

== See also ==
- Indigenous land rights
