= Aboriginal Land Rights Act 1976 =

Act of the Parliament of Australia

Aboriginal Land Rights (Northern Territory) Act 1976

Parliament of Australia
- Long title: An Act providing for the granting of Traditional Aboriginal Land in the Northern Territory for the benefit of Aboriginals, and for other purposes
- Citation: No. 191, 1976
- Territorial extent: Northern Territory
- Royal assent: 16 December 1976

Amended by
- Aboriginal Land Rights (Northern Territory) Amendment Bill 2006; Aboriginal Land Rights (Northern Territory) Amendment (Economic Empowerment) Act 2021
- Status: In force (amended)

The Aboriginal Land Rights (Northern Territory) Act 1976 (ALRA) is Australian federal government legislation that provides the basis upon which Aboriginal Australian people in the Northern Territory can claim rights to land based on traditional occupation. It was the first law by any Australian government that legally recognised the Aboriginal system of land ownership, and legislated the concept of inalienable freehold title, as such was a fundamental piece of social reform. Its long title is An Act providing for the granting of Traditional Aboriginal Land in the Northern Territory for the benefit of Aboriginals, and for other purposes.

The Act has been amended 27 times between 1978 and 2021. Significant amendments were the Aboriginal Land Rights (Northern Territory) Amendment Act 2006, and Aboriginal Land Rights (Northern Territory) Amendment (Economic Empowerment) Act 2021.

== History ==
The results of the 1967 Australian referendum meant that the Federal Government could make special laws relating to Aboriginal people which could override any state-based legislation; this was seen as a great victory in the struggle for Aboriginal land rights in Australia.

The Labor government under Gough Whitlam, after making land rights one of his election campaign priorities, first introduced a land rights Bill to Parliament. Whitlam chose to establish a precedent in the Northern Territory (NT), which was controlled by the Commonwealth (federal) government, rather than attempt federal legislation first off. He appointed Justice Woodward in February 1973 to head an inquiry into how best to recognise Aboriginal land rights in the NT, called the Aboriginal Land Rights Commission (also known as the "Woodward Royal Commission"). Woodward produced his final report in April 1974, expressing the opinion that one of the main aims of land rights was "The doing of simple justice to a people who have been deprived of their land without their consent and without compensation". He said that Aboriginal land should be granted as inalienable freehold title, meaning "it could not be acquired, sold, mortgaged or disposed of in any way", and title should be communal.

The Bill lapsed upon the dismissal of the government in 1975. The Liberal government, led by Malcolm Fraser, reintroduced a similar Bill, and this was signed by the Governor-General of Australia on 16 December 1976.

== Significance ==
It was the first law by any Australian government that legally recognised the Aboriginal system of land ownership, legislating the concept of inalienable freehold title, and thus the first of all Aboriginal land rights legislation in Australia. The Land Rights Act is a fundamental piece of social reform. It established the legal basis on which Aboriginal people could claim rights to land based on customary or traditional occupation, also known as native title, if evidence could be shown. (The South Australian Pitjantjatjara Lands Act 1956 had granted land to the Pitjantjatjara people, but as a one-off, did not provide a basis for future claims by others.)

== Description ==
The main purpose of the Act is "to reinstate ownership of traditional Aboriginal land in the Northern Territory to Aboriginal people" (Austrade). It provides for the grant of inalienable freehold title for Aboriginal land, meaning that the land cannot be bought or otherwise acquired, including by any NT law.

In the original Act, only claims to unalienated Crown land in the NT were permissible, under three district sections, and the Act specified an end date of June 1997 by which claims had to be lodged.

The Act allows for a claim of Australian native title if claimants can provide evidence of their traditional association with land. About 50% of the Northern Territory land and 85% of its coastline are owned communally by Aboriginal peoples.

Since 1976, many amendments to the Act have been passed. As of July 2020, the most recent compilation (No. 41) came into force on 4 April 2019. As of 2021, the major sections of the Act are:

- Part I—Preliminary
- Part II—Grants of land to Aboriginal Land Trusts
- Part IIA—Executive Director of Township Leasing
- Part III—Aboriginal Land Councils
- Part IV—Mining
- Part V—Aboriginal Land Commissioners
- Part VI—Aboriginals Benefit Account
- Part VIA—Northern Territory Aboriginal Investment Corporation
- Part VII—Miscellaneous
- Schedules 1–7

=== Part II: Aboriginal Land Trusts ===
Aboriginal Land Trusts are established under the Act. Their main functions are:

- to hold title to land vested in it in accordance with this Act; and
- to exercise its powers as owner of land for the benefit of the Aboriginal people concerned.

Title to the land granted under the Act is held by these land trusts; as of 2020, there are 151 Aboriginal land trusts, each administered by a land council, dependent on location of the trust.

=== Part III: Land Councils ===
The Act specified that at least two Land Councils must be created. The Central Land Council, covering the southern part of the NT, and the Northern Land Council, covering the northern part of the NT, were created by the Act. The Tiwi Land Council, covering Bathurst and Melville Islands north of Darwin, and the Anindilyakwa Land Council, covering Groote Eylandt and Bickerton Island in the Gulf of Carpentaria, were later created from parts of the Northern Land Council.

New Land Councils can be created under the Act: Section 23 of the Act specifies the functions of Land Councils; however, the four original land councils continue to exist as of 2020.

=== Part IV: Mining ===
Land development, including exploration and mining activities, on Aboriginal land are undertaken through negotiations with traditional owners groups and facilitated by land councils. Various types of payment for the land, other financial and non-financial benefits may be included in negotiations. The Act prescribes how the land councils and land trusts may grant usage rights and access, but in some circumstances a federal or NT Minister's approval is also required. Income received for the use of the land is distributed by the land councils according to the agreements with the traditional owners and as the Act provides.

Royalties paid to the NT and Federal governments for the use of the land are processed and directed to the Aboriginals Benefit Account (ABA) (Part VI of the Act) and the funds are to be used for certain purposes prescribed by the Act which benefit Aboriginal peoples in the NT.

=== Part VII: Miscellaneous ===
==== Sacred sites ====
Section 69 (under "Part VII - Miscellaneous") of the Act defines a special category of land, the sacred site, which is a site of significance according to Aboriginal tradition. It prohibits a person from entering a sacred site, with penalties of a fine or prison sentence. (There is also additional protection for sacred sites in the NT under the Northern Territory Aboriginal Sacred Sites Act 1989.)

== 1997 Reeves Report ==
A significant review of the Act (referred to as ALRA) was undertaken from October 1997, when the government appointed barrister John Reeves to examine its effectiveness, operation of aspects relating to mining and the Aboriginal Benefits Trust Account, and the role of the Land Councils. The Reeves Report concluded that the ALRA had been very effective in granting traditional Aboriginal land in the NT, with benefits exceeding their costs for the Aboriginal people, but it also made many recommendations for change.

After examination of the recommendations by various bodies in the following years, the Northern Territory Government and the Land Councils produced a joint response in June 2003, in their Detailed Joint Submission to the Commonwealth - Workability Reforms of the Aboriginal Land Rights (Northern Territory) Act 1976 (ALRA). Over some years, the issue of private versus communal ownership of Aboriginal land was considered and debated by many parties, including Warren Mundine, Mick Dodson, Galarrwuy Yunupingu, Noel Pearson and others. Tom Calma, as Aboriginal and Torres Strait Islander Social Justice Commissioner, said in his Native Title Report 2005 that it was "not necessary to put the communal tenure of Indigenous land at risk" by converting to individual freehold titles.

It was agreed that there were benefits in the new proposals, but various details were debated at length. Following the Government making changes to the ALRA in 2005, Australians for Native Title and Reconciliation expressed concern about Land Council funding and function changes and the establishment of new Land Councils. Tom Calma commented at length in July 2006, starting with three main concerns: that the amendments had been made without the full understanding and consent of traditional owners and Indigenous Northern Territorians; that the intention of the amendments was to reduce the capacity for Indigenous people to have decision making influence over their lands; and that it was likely that the amendments would have a range of negative impacts on Indigenous peoples' rights and interests.

== 2006 Amendments ==
On 17 August 2006, the Howard government amended the Act. The Aboriginal Land Rights (Northern Territory) Amendment Bill 2006, in effect from 1 July 2007, added several clauses to the Act.

The government summary of the Amendments includes "to increase access to Aboriginal land for development, especially exploration and mining; facilitate the leasing of Aboriginal land and the mortgaging of leases; provide for a tenure system for townships on Aboriginal land that will allow individuals to have property rights; devolve decision-making powers to regional Aboriginal communities", and change the provisions governing land councils to increase accountability.

The most significant amendments enabled Aboriginal groups to more directly manage their land. Two Land Councils (Central and Northern) manage mainland NT Aboriginal land. By comparison, New South Wales has 121 Land Councils. These new sections of the Act included Section 19a, which introduced the option of Township Leasing, and Section 28a, which introduced the option of a 'delegation of powers' to a local Aboriginal corporation.

== Local decision making ==
The Act specifies methods for Land Councils to support local Aboriginal groups to make decisions regarding their land, including:

- Part II (Grants of Land to Aboriginal Land Trusts): Section 19A: Land Trust may grant headlease over township
- Part III (Aboriginal Land Councils), Section 28A: Delegation of a Land Council's functions or powers to Aboriginal and Torres Strait Islander corporation

ALRA S.19A (Township Lease) v S.28A (Delegation) comparison
ALRA Section		S.19A Township Lease	S.28A Delegation of Powers
Legal Structure	Different	CATSI or ASIC Corporation, or Office of Township Leasing	CATSI Corporation
Representation of TOs and Residents	Similar	Defined in the rules of the receiving Corporation (S.19A and S.28A) and / or S.19A Lease. Both alternatives support the same representation options.	
Governance	Similar	Defined in the rules of the receiving Corporation (S.19A and S.28A) and / or S.19A Lease. Both alternatives support similar governance options.	
Length of Agreement	Different	Minimum 40 years; maximum 99 years	May be enduring or limited by agreement
Revocation	Different	Virtually non-revokeable, even for poor performance.	Subject to revocation by the Land Council
Consultation for Establishment	Different	For both S.19A and S.28A, the Land Council consults with TOs and residents, and must be satisfied that the decision is reasonable, and broadly understood and supported. For a S.19A Township Lease, a failure by the Land Council to consult properly with TOs and residents, or a failure to consult at all, does not invalidate the Lease.	
Sub-Agreements	Different	S.19 Sub-Leases Maximum term is dependent on the remaining S.19A term.	S.19 Leases Term is not dependent on S.28A term.
Consultation for Sub-Agreements	Different	Consultation is different from traditional Land Council practice. Any requirements for consultation for sub-leases would be part of the S.19A head lease. It is possible that no consultation with TOs and residents is necessary. Approval by TOs and residents at the time the S.19A Lease is issued, effectively bind later TOs and residents.	Consultation is consistent with traditional Land Council practice. Each sub-agreement (S.19 Lease or Licence) is subject to a clear process of consultation to ensure input/approval by current TOs and residents.

Existing Section 19A Township Leases:

Location	Land Council	Towns Included	Lease	
Location	Land Council	Towns Included	Term	Issue Date
Tiwi Islands	Tiwi LC	Wurrumiyanga	99 Years	20 Aug 2007
Tiwi Islands	Tiwi LC	Milikapiti & Wurankuwu	99 Years	22 Nov 2011
Tiwi Islands	Tiwi LC	Pirlangimpi	99 Years	26 Jun 2017
Groote & Bickerton Islands	Anildilyakwa LC	Anguragu, Umbakumba, & Milyakburra	40 Years	4 Dec 2008
Mutijulu	Central LC	Mutijulu (near Uluru)	67 Years	16 Mar 2017

== See also ==
- Aboriginal land rights legislation in Australia
- Gove land rights case (1971)
- Indigenous land rights
- Indigenous land rights in Australia
- List of laws concerning Indigenous Australians
- Native title in Australia
- Yirrkala bark petitions (1963)
