= Indigenous land rights in Australia =

Rights and interests of Aboriginal and Torres Strait Islander people in Australia

In Australia, Indigenous land rights or Aboriginal land rights are the rights and interests in land of Aboriginal Australians and Torres Strait Islander people; the term may also include the struggle for those rights. Connection to the land and waters is vital in Australian Aboriginal culture and to that of Torres Strait Islander people, and there has been a long battle to gain legal and moral recognition of ownership of the lands and waters occupied by the many peoples prior to colonisation of Australia starting in 1788, and the annexation of the Torres Strait Islands by the colony of Queensland in the 1870s.

As of 2020, Aboriginal and Torres Strait Islander peoples’ rights and interests in land are formally recognised over around 40 per cent of Australia’s land mass, and sea rights have also been asserted in various native title cases.

== Description and distinctions ==
According to the Attorney-General's Department:

There are fundamental differences between land rights and native title. Land rights are rights created by the Australian, state or territory governments. Land rights usually consist of a grant of freehold or perpetual lease title to Indigenous Australians. By contrast, native title arises as a result of the recognition, under Australian common law, of pre-existing Indigenous rights and interests according to traditional laws and customs. Native title is not a grant or right created by governments.

Native title in Australia includes rights and interests relating to land and waters held by Indigenous Australians under traditional laws and customs, and recognised in accordance with the Native Title Act 1993 (Cth). Although this is federal legislation and therefore applicable to the whole of Australia, the way in which the processes for native title operate in each state and territory is dependent on the history of the land rights arrangements of the particular state or territory. In some jurisdictions, titles to large areas of traditional lands were granted before the Act commenced.

The Native Title Act was passed following the High Court of Australia decision of Mabo v Queensland (No. 2), which recognised for the first time that Indigenous people had rights to land sourced from their continuing connection to it and that these rights are recognised under Australian common law. Where these rights had not been extinguished through contradictory Crown grants, native titles continued to exist and could exist alongside certain title, such as crown leases.

Different types of land rights laws exist in Australia, allowing for the renewed ownership of land to Indigenous Australians under various conditions. Land rights schemes are in place in the Northern Territory, Queensland (including the Torres Strait Islands), New South Wales, South Australia, Victoria and Tasmania. The land titles may recognise traditional interest in the land and protect those interests by giving Aboriginal people legal ownership of that land. Also, according to the National Native Title Tribunal: "A successful land rights claim usually results in a special grant of freehold title or perpetual lease. A title document for the land is issued. The title is normally held by a community or an organisation, not by individuals. There are usually some restrictions on selling, and dealing with, land that has been granted in a land rights claim. Normally, the land will be passed down to future generations in a way that recognises the community’s traditional connection to that country".

Indigenous land rights relate to the rights and interests in land of Aboriginal and Torres Strait Islander people in Australia, and the term is also used to describe the struggle for those rights.

As of 2020, Aboriginal and Torres Strait Islander peoples’ rights and interests in land are formally recognised over around 40 per cent of Australia’s land mass. The recognition of Indigenous rights in land and waters is fundamental to the process of reconciliation.

== History ==
The colonisation of mainland Australia started in the 1700s, while the Torres Strait Islands were only taken over by the colony of Queensland in the 1870s.

The Letters Patent establishing the Province of South Australia of 1836, which were issued during the period of British colonisation of South Australia, included recognition of the rights of the Aboriginal peoples of South Australia – the first ever recognition of Aboriginal rights on the continent – but the promise was never kept.

During the late 19th and early 20th centuries, the movement of Aboriginal peoples in Australia was controlled by colony- and later state-based laws, such as the Aboriginals Protection and Restriction of the Sale of Opium Act 1897 in Queensland. This often meant that they were confined to living on Aboriginal reserves or mission stations, where they had no rights to land ownership.

=== The struggle for land rights ===
The passing of Aboriginal land rights legislation in Australia in the late 20th century was preceded by a number of important Aboriginal protests. The modern land rights movement started with the 1963 Yolngu Bark Petition, when Yolngu people from the remote settlement of Yirrkala, in north-east Arnhem Land, petitioned the federal government to have their land and rights given back. The 1966 Wave Hill Walk-Off, or Gurundji Strike, started with a protest about working conditions, but grew into a lands right issue, with the people claiming rights to the land which was then a cattle station owned by a large British company, Vesteys. The strike lasted for eight years.

In 1961, at the Native Welfare Conference, a meeting of federal and state ministers responsible for Aboriginal welfare, agreed on a policy of assimilation. The measures included the removal of discriminatory legislation and restrictive practices, welfare measures, education and training to assist the involvement of Aboriginal people in the economy, and the education of non-Indigenous Australians about Aboriginal culture and history. It brought about a more widespread awareness by non-Indigenous people to social justice for Aboriginal and Torres Strait Islander people. South Australian premier Sir Thomas Playford argued for integration rather than assimilation of Aboriginal people, and others questioned the concept of assimilation, with its paternalistic attitude.

The Aboriginal Lands Trust Act 1966 (SA) established the South Australian Aboriginal Lands Trust (ALT). This was the first major recognition of Aboriginal land rights by any Australian government, and predated the 1967 Referendum. It allowed for parcels of Aboriginal land previously held by the SA Government, to be handed to the Aboriginal Lands Trust of SA under the Act. The Trust was governed by a Board composed solely of Aboriginal people.

=== 1970s activism and legislation ===
In the 1970s, Indigenous Australians became more politically active, and a powerful movement for the recognition of Indigenous land rights emerged. Also during this decade, the federal government started buying privately owned land in order to benefit Indigenous communities, and also to create Crown land which would be available for claim.

In 1971, Justice Richard Blackburn of the Supreme Court of the Northern Territory ruled against the Yolngu in Milirrpum v Nabalco Pty Ltd (the "Gove land rights case"), when they sought native title rights over the Gove Peninsula. However, Justice Blackburn did acknowledge the claimants' ritual and economic use of the land and that they had an established system of law "a subtle and highly elaborate" system of laws (Madayin). In this way, this was the first significant legal case for Aboriginal land rights in Australia.

==== Aboriginal Tent Embassy ====
The Aboriginal Tent Embassy was set up on the front lawns of Old Parliament House, Canberra on 26 January (Australia Day) 1972, by four Aboriginal activists, Michael Anderson, Billy Craigie, Tony Coorey and Bertie Williams (later Kevin "Bert" Johnson, as protest for Indigenous land rights. The embassy was established in response to the McMahon Coalition Government's refusal to recognise Aboriginal land rights or native title in Australia, instead offering 50-year general-purpose leases for Aboriginal people which would be conditional upon their "intention and ability to make reasonable economic and social use of land", while reserving for the Crown rights to minerals and forestry.

==== Black Moratorium ====
The Black Moratorium refers to protests which took place on 14 July 1972. The Sydney protest was in the form of marches from Redfern, Sydney University and other points, to Sydney Town Hall, attended by around 6,000 protesters, who included Aboriginal people, students and trade unionists. Gary Foley printed a pamphlet at Sydney University ahead of the protest. Unionists from several trades, including builders' labourers, ship painters, dockers and teachers, had voted to go on strike for half a day in support of Aboriginal people, and around 2,000 students joined the protest. There were also protests in Newcastle, Brisbane, and Darwin, all under the rallying cry of "Ningla-A-na" (Arrernte for "hungry land"). The demands of the protesters were, specifically:

1. Absolute ownership, including mineral and forestry rights of all reserves and traditional areas to be vested in the Black communities associated with these areas.
2. Full compensation for all land seized since 1770.
3. The right and power of Black communities to control their lives and their land.
4. Support for all Black struggles, including those for:

- a) An immediate and massive Health program to eliminate the very high Black infant mortality rate
- b) Full employment on at least award wages
- c) Decent housing and no evictions
- d) Black studies and culture in education
- e) Real equality in education
- f) An end to all discrimination and discriminatory legislation (e.g. Queensland Acts.)

The moratorium as a tactic was copied from the campaign against the Vietnam War: a weekday protest meant that union supporters would need to convince others in their workplace about why solidarity with Aboriginal people was an important issue for their movement. Striking would both disrupt the economy and show strong conviction and understanding of the struggle, and the discussion put Black rights into workplaces, staff rooms and classrooms. It was later assessed as one of the most successful and historically significant protests for Aboriginal rights in Australia until this time. Its legacy included the establishments of networks which led to thousands of people defending the Tent Embassy against attempts by police to shut it down, and union funding helped keep the embassy running. The Moratorium showed that non-Indigenous workers could be strong allies in the struggle for Indigenous rights. Bruce McGuinness published an article in the November issue of Aboriginal and Islander Identity magazine about the march in Melbourne, which was attended by about 2000 people, including an estimated 16% of the Black population. It also had a heavy police presence.

==== Aboriginal Land Rights Act 1976 ====
In the wake of Milirrpum, the Aboriginal Land Rights Commission (also known as the "Woodward Royal Commission") was established in the Northern Territory in 1973. This Royal Commission, chaired by Justice Woodward, made a number of recommendations in favour of recognising Aboriginal Land Rights. Taking up many of these recommendations, the Whitlam government introduced an Aboriginal Land Rights Bill to Parliament; however, this lapsed upon the dismissal of the government in 1975. The succeeding conservative government, led by Malcolm Fraser, reintroduced a Bill, though not of the same content, and it was signed by the governor-general of Australia on 16 December 1976.

The Aboriginal Land Rights Act 1976 established the basis upon which Aboriginal people in the Northern Territory could claim rights to land based on traditional occupation. The statute, the first of the Aboriginal land rights acts, was significant in that it allowed a claim of title if claimants could provide evidence of their traditional association with land. Four Land Councils were established in the Northern Territory under this law.

The Aboriginal Land Rights Act 1976 established a procedure that transferred almost 50 per cent of land in the Northern Territory (around 600 000 km2) to collective Aboriginal ownership. Following this, some states introduced their own land rights legislation; however, there were significant limitations on the returned lands, or that available for claim.

Paul Coe, in Coe v Commonwealth (1979), attempted (unsuccessfully) to bring a class action on behalf of all "Aborigines" claiming all of Australia.

=== 1980s South Australia ===
In 1981 South Australian premier David Tonkin returned 102,650 square kilometres (39,630 sq mi) of land (10.2% of the state's land area) to the Pitjantjara/Yankunytjatjara people, as the APY lands. The land rights legislation was introduced by Premier Don Dunstan in November 1978, several months prior to his resignation from Parliament. An amended bill, following extensive consultation, was passed by the Tonkin Liberal Government, as the Anangu Pitjantjatjara Yankunytjatjara Land Rights Act 1981.

In 1984 Premier John Bannon's Labor Government passed the Maralinga Tjarutja Land Rights Act 1984 to return lands to the Pitjantjara people in the remote western area of the state. The legislation was proclaimed in January 1985 and was followed by a ceremony in the desert attended by Maralinga Tjarutja leader Archie Barton, John Bannon and Aboriginal Affairs Minister Greg Crafter.

=== 1995: Indigenous Land Corporation ===
In 1995 the Indigenous Land Corporation (ILC) was established by the Federal Government to assist Aboriginal Australians to acquire land and manage Aboriginal held land sustainably and in a manner that provides cultural, social, economic and environmental benefits for themselves and future generations. In February 2019, the ILC became the Indigenous Land and Sea Corporation (ILSC), in recognition of its operations on water. The ILSC is funded by an annual payment from the investment returns of the Australian Government's Aboriginal and Torres Strait Islander Land Account.

== Indigenous land tenure by state and territory ==
=== Northern Territory ===
The Aboriginal Land Rights (Northern Territory) Act 1976 (see above) provides the basis upon which Aboriginal Australian people in the Northern Territory can claim rights to land based on traditional occupation. The freehold land cannot be sold or transferred, but it can be leased.

In 2025, the High Court of Australia upheld an earlier ruling from the Federal Court in an action brought by Yunupingu on behalf of the Gumatj peoples of the Northern Territory. The decision potentially means the Commonwealth may be liable to claims of compensation for decisions made which extinguished native title claims for territories under its administration. The Northern Territory was under the administration of the Commonwealth from its creation in 1911 to 1978 when it was granted self-government.

=== Queensland ===
In Queensland, the Aboriginal Land Act 1991 and the Torres Strait Islander Land Act 1991 provide for Aboriginal and Torres Strait Islander freehold respectively. Aboriginal and Torres Strait Islander freehold land occupies 5%, or 59,489 square kilometres (22,969 sq mi) of northern Queensland. A Registered Native Title Body Corporate (RNTBC) can be trustee of this land, who can grant leases of up to 99 years for any purpose.

A third type of land tenure, mainly held by Aboriginal and Torres Strait Islander communities in remote and regional Queensland, is the Deed of Grant in Trust (DOGIT). These were established primarily to administer former Aboriginal reserves and missions. They came about through legislation passed by the Queensland Government in 1984. Aboriginal and Torres Strait Islander local governments hold trusteeship of the DOGITs, and land tenure under this type of tenure is held in collective title, held in trust for future generations. From 1 January 2015, some trustees, namely those classified as "urban" or "future urban") are able to convert parts of the collective title to either Aboriginal freehold or Torres Strait Islander freehold title.

Mer (Murray) Island (the subject of the Mabo No.1 (1988) and No.2 (1992) cases) is Torres Strait Islander freehold and Aurukun is Aboriginal freehold land.

=== South Australia ===
In the 2013 Review of the Aboriginal Lands Trust Act 1966, the powers of the Trust were reviewed and changed to modernise the Trust and the Aboriginal Lands Trust of South Australia Act 2013 (SA) was passed.

=== Western Australia ===
The Aboriginal Lands Trust (ALT) of Western Australia was established by the Aboriginal Affairs Planning Authority Act 1972. This body holds about 24,000,000 hectares (59,000,000 acres), or 10% of the State's land. There are different types of tenures held by different parts of this land, including reserves, leases and freehold property. There are many remote communities on this land, inhabited by about 12,000 people. Land reform is ongoing, to use the land in a way which benefits the Aboriginal people.

== Freemen/sovereign state movement ==
Since the 2010s, there has been a growing number of freemen on the land / sovereign citizen groups targeting Indigenous Australians, with groups with names like Tribal Sovereign Parliament of Gondwana Land, the Original Sovereign Tribal Federation (OSTF) and the Original Sovereign Confederation. OSTF Founder Mark McMurtrie, an Aboriginal Australian man, has produced YouTube videos speaking about “common law”, which incorporate Freemen beliefs. Appealing to other Aboriginal people by partly identifying with the land rights movement, McMurtrie played on their feelings of alienation and lack of trust in the systems which had not served Indigenous people well. Proponents of the original ideas are often related to far-right movements, whose core beliefs may be broadly defined as "see[ing] the state as a corporation with no authority over free citizens".

== See also ==
- Aboriginal land rights legislation in Australia
- Aboriginal land rights
- Aboriginal reserves
- Always was, always will be
- Australian Aboriginal Sovereignty
- Federal Council for the Advancement of Aborigines and Torres Strait Islanders
- Indigenous Australian traditional custodianship
- Indigenous treaties in Australia
- Native title in Australia
- Secession in Australia
- One Australia Movement
- Land Back (reclaiming Indigenous jurisdiction – United States)
