= Richmond Depot =

The Richmond Depot, or the Richmond Clothing Bureau, was a clothing and equipment facility located in three primary facilities, in and around Richmond, Virginia, established late in 1861, that supplied uniforms, footwear, and other equipment to the Confederate States Army, primarily the Army of Northern Virginia, and the surrounding region of the Commonwealth of Virginia. Richmond Depot uniforms were not issued to western or Deep South Confederates, such as the Army of Tennessee.

== History ==
In April 1861 at the beginning of the American Civil War the Confederates States Congress turned to Prussian artist Nicola Marschall to design a new uniform for the Confederate military. Marschall's designs were inspired by the grey uniforms he had seen on a group of Austrian sharpshooters in Italy in 1857. Marschall's new uniform designs were approved and released as General Order #9 on 6 June 1861 to be applied to all Confederate forces. Early in the War the Confederate government had relied upon the "Commutation System" to keep its troops well supplied with clothing and equipment, but as the war dragged on into its second year of conflict, the system proved to be faulty. Early in 1862, the Confederate Government set new guidelines and developed the "Depot system", a series of federal government controlled facilities, that would have a steady supply of equipment to the soldiers and sailors of the Confederacy in the region of that depot. The Richmond Clothing Bureau was one of these such facilities, and was one of the more successful, keeping in operation from the early winter of 1861/62, to the last days of the Confederate States Army's control over Richmond, Virginia, in April 1865. It had two branches: the Shoe Manufactory under Captain Stephen Putney and the Clothing Manufactory under O.F. Weisiger, a civilian (until 1863 when he was made a captain.)

=== Produced equipment ===
The Richmond depot produced several variations of jackets, trousers, and caps; including militia styled uniforms authorized by the Confederate Government for construction and distribution. The most common items produced, are the Richmond Depot style shell jacket, the Trousers, and the Kepi. The materials used by the Richmond Depot, were produced by the Crenshaw Wool Mill, in Richmond, Virginia, near the Tredegar Iron Works, both of which were burnt down in mid-1863. The wool produced by this mill was a medium to bright cadet grey, often in 60 inch-wide bolts, with the blankets being produced in 60 by 80 inches (150 cm × 200 cm), probably of the same cadet grey material. Later in the war, imported dark cadet grey kersey, known as "English Army cloth", was being used in the domestically produced jackets, trousers, and caps, as well as the complete uniforms brought through the blockade by companies, such as Peter Tait of Limerick, Ireland. These uniforms started to become commonplace in the Army of Northern Virginia and the rest of the Confederate States Army later in the war. Battle flags were also produced by the depot from early 1862 to the end of the war in Virginia. These flags were made using captured red, blue, and white bunting stock from the captured Norfolk Naval yards. These fabrics were originally intended to be sewn into United States and other various flags.

=== Jacket design ===
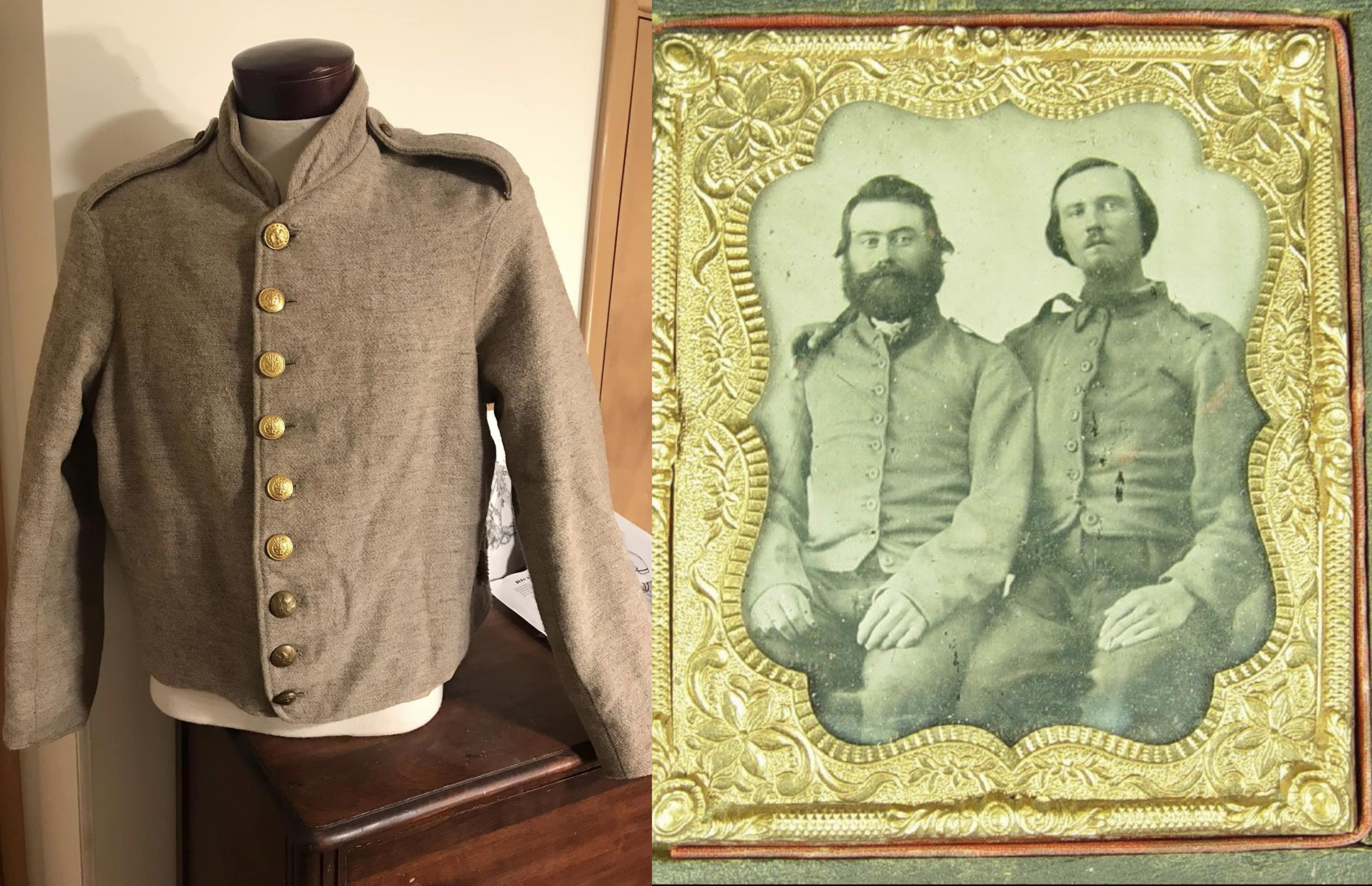
Richmond Depot shell jacket

The jackets produced during the war were not grouped into different types until long after the war was over, being set by modern historians. Many, if not all of the jackets were produced from the Richmond depot in a production line, with the details being omitted as time went by to save material due to wartime shortages and faster completion rates. One of the parts of this 'production line' consisted of sewing groups, or the ladies of the towns and city, that would come to the facilities, take unfinished uniforms and bolts of cloth, and drop off the completed uniforms. Three types of Richmond Depot jackets were produced:

1. The Richmond Depot Type I was issued late in 1861 or the beginning of 1862. The Richmond Depot Type I was a jacket with a six-piece body and two-piece sleeves, with an eight- or nine-button front, shoulder straps and probably belt loops. There were generally two buttons on the cuffs. The lining was probably a cotton osnaburg. The distinctive point about the first pattern jacket was that instead of having the regulation collar and sleeve facings as prescribed in General Order #9, it was trimmed on the collar, shoulder straps and cuffs with either tape or piping which appears to be usually dark colored, using 1/4-inch tape, or 1/8-inch piping. Today, there are no surviving Type I jackets, but based on photographs, these details can be deduced.
2. In mid-1862, the Type I was phased out for the Richmond Depot Type II. Due to scarce supplies, they were made of jeans (a mixture of wool and cotton) or satinette and cassimere. There are several extant examples of Type IIs throughout the United States, including in the American Civil War Museum. The Richmond Depot Type II jacket is characterized by a nine-button front, no buttons on the cuffs, top-stitched edges, shoulder straps, belt loops on each hip, an unbleached cotton osnaburg lining and interior pockets. It has a six-piece body and two-piece sleeves. Generally, it has no trim, although examples with partial trim do exist.
3. The Type II was phased out in mid-1864 for the Richmond Depot Type III. This was the last Richmond Depot jacket issued to the Army of Northern Virginia. It was primarily made from a blue-grey English wool material which had been imported from Britain. The major contractor was Peter Tait of "Tait and Co Army Contracts" located in Limerick, Ireland, who also supplied uniforms for the British Army. The Confederate government had begun trading with Tait in late 1863 specifically for the supply of jackets and trousers. Pants were made of the same material. Tait not only made the uniforms but also ran them through the Union blockade in his own steamers the Elavey, Eveline and Kelpie, none of which were captured. The bulk of the contract started to arrive in autumn 1864. In addition to supplying ready-made uniforms, Tait supplied raw material for local construction by the depot. The Type III was issued concurrent with the type II, from 1863 till the end of the war but with no epaulettes, belt loops or trim. Seven of these jackets have survived, and there are a number of identifiable photographs that show them in use. From the handful of surviving artifacts it appears that most may have been made with either all blue or blue-trimmed collars, and either all blue or blue-trimmed epaulettes (despite different colors prescribed for the different branches of service.) To confuse things further, one original artifact, worn by a Private from South Carolina, Francis M. Durham, has a red collar and no epaulettes. All had British sizings stamped inside the jackets. This makes them easy to identify as none of the surviving depot-made artifacts have sizings noted in them. Since these jackets were produced over a considerable period of time, and because they were made from materials available at different times, variations in the coat material and the number of buttons have been noted.
- There are also different variations of these jackets, in both cut and material, as the war progressed. Such as the number of buttons on one jacket, which belonged to George H. T. Greer, General Jubal Early's staff; this example only possesses six of the nine buttons that are normally found on the other jackets. One other, which is believed to belong to Pvt. Henry Redwood, has eight buttons, however, the bottom of the jacket shows evidence of new stitching and other modifications, leading historians to believe that this was intentional on the part of Pvt. Redwood.

=== Trouser design ===
The trousers issued by the Richmond Depot are similar in design to some pre-war civilian trousers, with a back buckle and belt for adjustment to the wearer, and squared, "mule ear" pockets, some with buttons to keep the square flaps of these pockets up. The original depot-issued trousers were French blue and made of wool. This blue was darker and more vibrant than the sky blue color of Federal uniform pants. In late 1862 when the depot started producing uniforms made of cadet-grey jeans cloth, trousers were also produced in matching material and color. Then again in 1863 after the depot began receiving the blue-grey cloth from Europe uniform trousers were once again manufactured in the same material and color until the conclusion of the war in 1865. Nevertheless, there are several artifacts of late-war trousers, that were produced with light or sky blue wool kersey, which by color resemble the United States Army regulation trousers, but are not similar in construction to any pair produced in the northern U.S. held Arsenals.

=== Battle flag designs ===
The design of the Battle flag from the Richmond depot, are similar to the specifications stated in the autumn/winter of 1861. There are three types of Battle flags made from this depot, much like the jackets, these groups were not designated until after the war. These three primary designations had the corps traits of the A.N.V. design flags: a red background, a blue cross, with a white edge on the cross, and an edge border of either orange or white cloth, with twelve or thirteen stars inside the blue cross.

1. The first bunting issue flags, were large, some at 51 square inches (330 cm^{2}), had an 8 in-wide saltire, or cross, in blue wool, with an orange wool edge around the entire flag, except the header, or pole edge, which was made of heavy canvas.
2. The second type was different, only by the size of the cross, being reduced to 5 inches (130 mm) wide, saving a large amount of material for flags in production.
3. The third type was changed by only one feature from the second type, the orange bunting edges were exchanged for an off-white border, as the orange bunting was becoming exhausted by mid-1862.

Many of these flags were produced using the same design, but due to influences by the sewing groups making them, all of these flags are unique, some having a continuous strip of edge cloth around the flag, others had the stars on the separated part of the cross further from the center star. Several flags from this depot were made in various sizes, most were, or were close to 48 square inches (310 cm^{2}), while several examples show flags of smaller designs, ranging from 44 centimetres (17 in), down to 36 centimetres (14 in). Many of such variations can be seen in the collection held by the American Civil War Museum.

== See also ==
- Uniforms of the Confederate States military forces
- Shell jacket
