= Shell jacket =

Military uniform garment

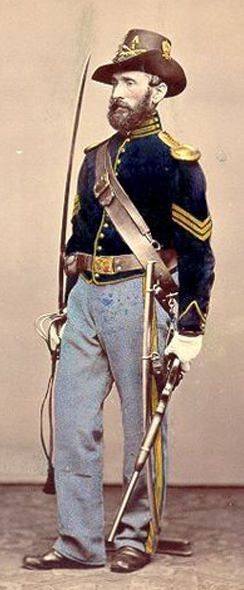
US cavalry sgt

Richmond Depot Shell Jacket (left)

A shell jacket is a garment used as part of a military uniform. It is a short jacket that reaches down to hip level. It was very common in the mid and late 19th century. The jacket was first created in Austria.

== History ==
The shell jacket was first introduced to European armies toward the end of the 18th Century. Prior to this, European soldiers, infantry, cavalry and artillery had worn open dress uniform coats with turn-back lapels over either coloured or white sleeved-waistcoats and breeches. The advent of closed uniform coatees, i.e. waist- length jackets with standing collars and tails, buttoned from throat to waist, meant that sleeved waistcoats could not be worn underneath and therefore fell redundant. However, in order to save damage or staining to dress coatees while on fatigue duties, etc., a new, relatively plain coloured waist-length jacket was introduced. The term “shell” jacket is of British origin, appearing during the 1790s, when light dragoons adopted a dark blue short jacket with a decorative sleeveless over-jacket or “shell” on top. Though short-lived, the name stuck and was later to be applied to waist-length, sleeved fatigue jackets from about 1800. During the first half of the 19th Century, the British Army wore dress coatees in battle against Europeans or Americans, but tended to wear shell jackets on colonial campaigns. However, the shell jacket was discontinued by the British in the 1870s (other than by certain cavalry regiments) in favour of a second, plainer skirted tunic. Guards and Highland regiments continued to wear white shell jackets for “walking out” until 1914.

The shell jacket became regulation for the US army in 1833, replacing the Napoleonic-era blue tailcoat. Infantry jackets were sky blue with white piping and silver buttons. Cavalry uniforms were navy blue with orange (later yellow) piping and artillery uniforms were identical but with red piping; they had brass rather than silver buttons. The infantry uniform was worn during the Mexican War until 1851 when it was replaced with the dark blue frock coat with sky blue piping. Trousers with a fly front replaced the older-style flap-front design and kepis and Hardee hats replaced the M1839 wheel cap. Cavalry and artillery shell jackets remained in use until after the American Civil War as they were more practical for mounted troops than the long frock (which was briefly introduced in 1851 but rejected).

The Confederate States of America adopted the jacket in 1861; the most famous are the Richmond Depot's, RDI, RDII, and RDIII. Columbus Depot, Department of Alabama, and Atlanta Depot also were common famous suppliers. See uniforms of the Confederate States military forces for more information.

== Modern versions ==
During World War II, Dwight D. Eisenhower popularised a waist-length jacket based on British Battle Dress. This was known as an Ike Jacket and after the war was adopted as a uniform by many US police forces. Blue denim versions became popular among urban workers, cowboys, truck drivers and teenagers. Today these jackets (often with patches, studs and badges added) are popular among bikers, greasers, metalheads and punks. In addition it plays a minor role in mainstream European fashion.

== See also ==
- Uniform of the Union Army
- Uniforms of the Confederate States military forces
- Eisenhower jacket
