= Military uniforms of the Confederate States =

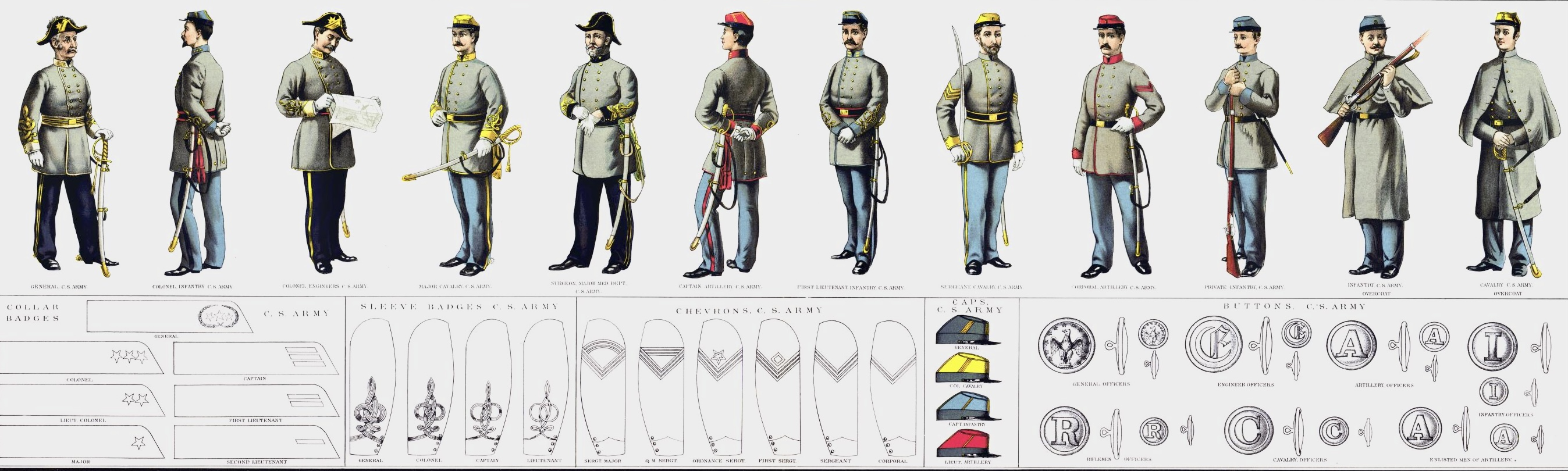
C.S. Army uniforms and insignia, War of the Rebellion Atlas (1895)

Each branch of the Confederate States armed forces had its own service dress and fatigue uniforms and regulations regarding them during the American Civil War, which lasted from April 12, 1861, until May 1865.

The uniform initially varied greatly due to a variety of reasons such as location and limitations on the supply of cloth and other materials, State regulations that were different from the standard regulations, and the cost of materials during the war. Texas units, for example, had access to massive stocks of U.S. blue uniforms, which were acquired after Confederate forces captured a U.S. supply depot in San Antonio in 1861. These were worn as late as 1863.

Early on, servicemen sometimes wore combinations of uniform pieces, making do with what they could get from captured United States Army soldiers, or from U.S. and Confederate dead or just wear civilian clothing. There are some controversies about some of the exact details of a few of the uniforms since some of the records were lost or destroyed after the Civil War ended.

== Confederate States Army ==
=== Design ===
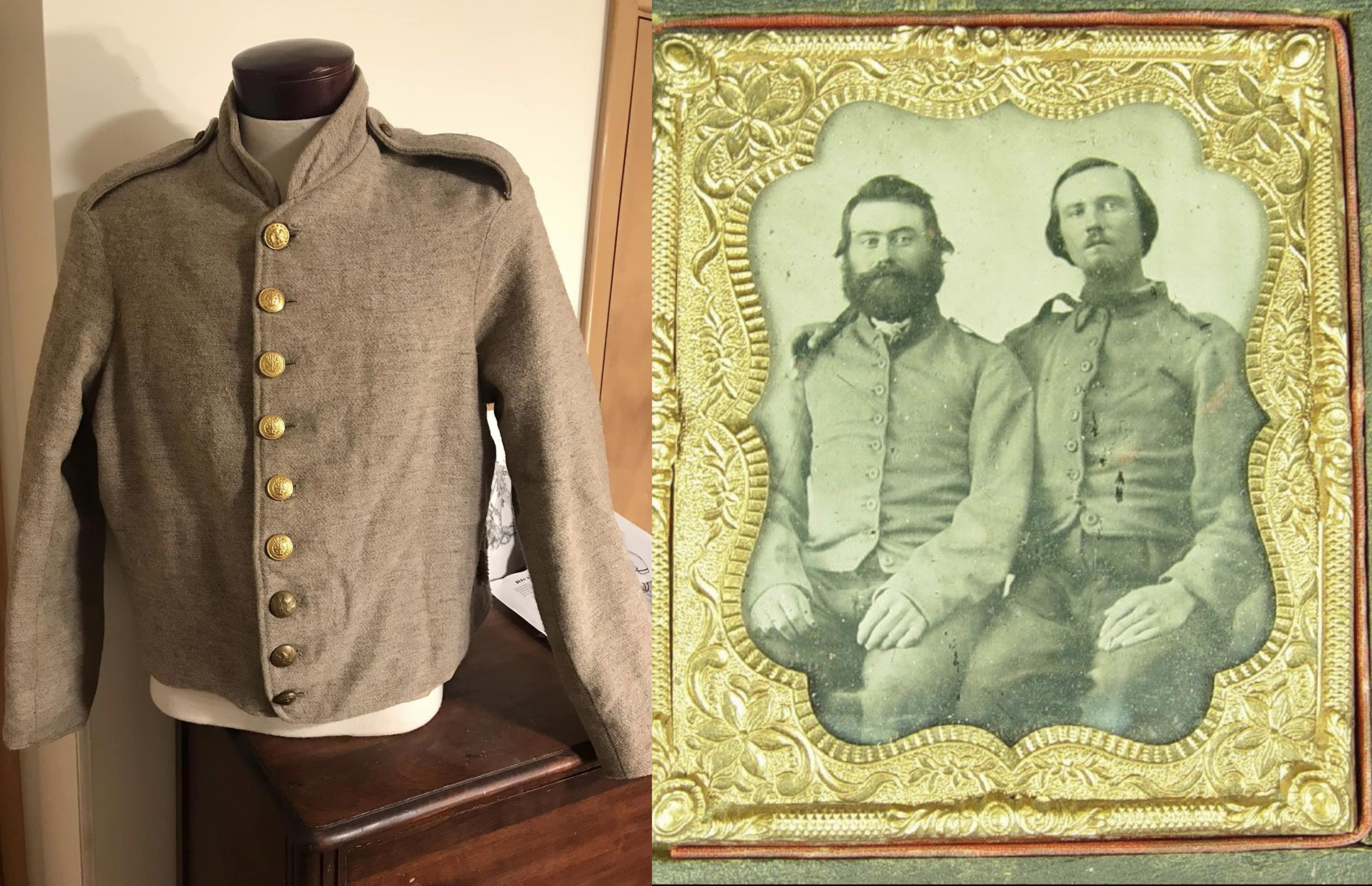
Richmond Depot shell jacket

The use of wool in the uniform meant that the uniforms were not suited to the warm climates that were common in the South. This contributed to many Confederate soldiers suffering from heatstroke on long marches. However, one understanding of the heavy woolen garments is that after the marching during the day time, when the soldiers would rest at night and cool themselves down, the thermal-shock could render some men unable to function the next day. As such, the woolen garments would protect the soldiers from this, and keep them able to keep marching the next day to fulfill their duties. This was also the case with the better equipped U.S. Army. Many Confederate soldiers started the war with frock coats. However, cloth shortages and wartime wear ensured that, by 1863, waist-length cadet gray or butternut shell jackets were generally worn by Confederates in the Eastern and Western Theaters. Examples of frock coats being worn by enlisted men can be seen in photographs taken after the battles of Gettysburg, (1863), and Spotsylvania, (1864).

Gray was not chosen for camouflage. It did, however, at times provide enough of a mask along tree lines during battle, keeping the line of infantry hidden long enough to strike effectively. At the time of the American Civil War, the usefulness of camouflage in combat was not generally recognized. Gray was chosen for Confederate uniforms because gray dye could be made relatively cheaply and it was the standard uniform color of the various state militias. The gray uniforms worn by early state volunteers was normally a shade of cadet gray, which is less suitable for combat wear, as it gives away the position of the individual easily from its bright blue-gray tones, and for this reason it was preserved by some men for dress-parade functions. The gray mentioned is dull toned, often varying in color depending on the region and time during the conflict, resulting in a uniform that could blend in with the tree lines, or hide the men in the field wearing them.

Generally, the uniform jacket of the Confederate soldier was single breasted, made of gray or brown fabric, with a six- to nine-button front. The design of the garment featured several variations: a four- to six- piece body, and one- or two-piece sleeves, usually with lining, often of a cotton material. The fabric used in these jackets, ranged from the finer kerseys and broadcloths used early in the war, to the cotton/wool blends of jeans, satinette, and cassimere, to name several examples. The exact color of the fabric also ranged from the prewar bright cadet gray, similar to the fabric used by Virginia Military Institute, or U. S. Military Academy dress uniforms, to the sumac and logwood dyed fabrics, that would eventually fade to the ragged butternut appearance. Epaulettes may have been used in the construction of the jacket, as was the case for the Richmond clothing bureau designed jackets, commonly called today, the Richmond Depot types I, II, and III. Belt loops were also in intermittent use, such as the Richmond and the Charleston clothing depots. Trimming on the jackets range from piped or taped collars, cuffs, and front lapel edges, to full facings on the collar and cuffs, commonly in light blue, dark blue, red, or black. Owing to the difficulty in obtaining yellow dye ingredients as the war progressed, yellow was infrequently used by the Cavalry Corps throughout the conflict.

== Service dress ==
The original Confederate uniforms from all branches of the military closely followed the lines of the U.S. Armed Forces. This was until June 6, 1861, when the Confederate Council issued General Order 9, the new regulations for the Confederate infantry, cavalry and artillery.

The new uniforms were designed by Nicola Marschall, a German-American artist who also designed the original Confederate flag. He was heavily influenced by the mid-1800s uniforms of the Austrian and French armies.

Although the regular Confederate military had a paper strength of 6,000 personnel, the first 100,000 volunteers from all over the South participated in a variety of dress. Many were from state militia outfits, which had their own state-issued uniforms. In the early battles, some Confederate units that wore dark blue uniforms were often mistaken on the field of battle for the enemy. Conversely, many U.S. units that were originally militia units went to war wearing gray.

It was not until the depot system was established in early 1862 by the Confederate quartermaster in Richmond, Virginia, that uniforms were mass-produced and supplied to troops. Until that time, the "commutation system" was in place; this allowed soldiers to have their own uniforms made to the new CSA regulations and to be reimbursed by the CS government. The allowance for uniforms was $21 ($656.21 in 2025) per six months. In a letter from 2nd Arkansas Cavalry Regiment (Slemons') Company D's Lieutenant Walter Greenfield to his wife on April 11, 1862, from his encampment near Shiloh, Greenfield writes:

All our company officers are fully equipped. Uniforms are only $90 dollars and saddles $85.

Officers had to buy their own uniforms until March 6, 1864, when General Order 28 was released; this allowed Confederate officers to purchase uniforms from the same sources as the troops, and at cost price.

Following the Richmond Depot, other depots started up throughout the South to supply their respective regional forces. Major depots were in Columbus, Athens and Atlanta, Georgia for the Army of Tennessee and Houston, Texas and Shreveport, Louisiana for the Trans-Mississippi forces. The use of the depot system meant that army-wide uniformity was impossible, as different depots had unique uniforms (Columbus Depot jackets for instance, had breast pockets, whilst Richmond Depot jackets did not). This resulted in a varied set of uniforms worn by different Confederate units.

As the war progressed, the image began to shift from the "ragged rebel" look to a well-uniformed Army in the eastern and western theaters. In the last 12 months of fighting, these Confederate forces were well-uniformed, the best they had ever appeared in terms of consistency, wearing clothing made of imported blue-gray cloth, either manufactured locally or bought ready-made under contract from British manufacturers, such as Peter Tait of Limerick, Ireland, who became a major supplier of uniforms for the Confederacy.

In the Department of the Trans-Mississippi, problems with the distribution of the plentiful uniforms made in Houston and Shreveport meant that the south western forces went without proper uniforms for some part of the war.

Confederate headgear was to be the chasseur cap, or "kepi", a French military cap. Often broad felt or straw hats or even slouch hats were worn instead. The Federal Army style forage cap was also popular. General Stonewall Jackson was famous for wearing the forage cap. Confederate Cavalry troops often wore Hardee hats, much like the U.S. Army Cavalry, which was a representative of the additional "flair" associated with the Cavalry troops. Two examples of CSA Cavalry officers famous for wearing these hats are Colonel John S. Mosby and General J. E. B. Stuart.

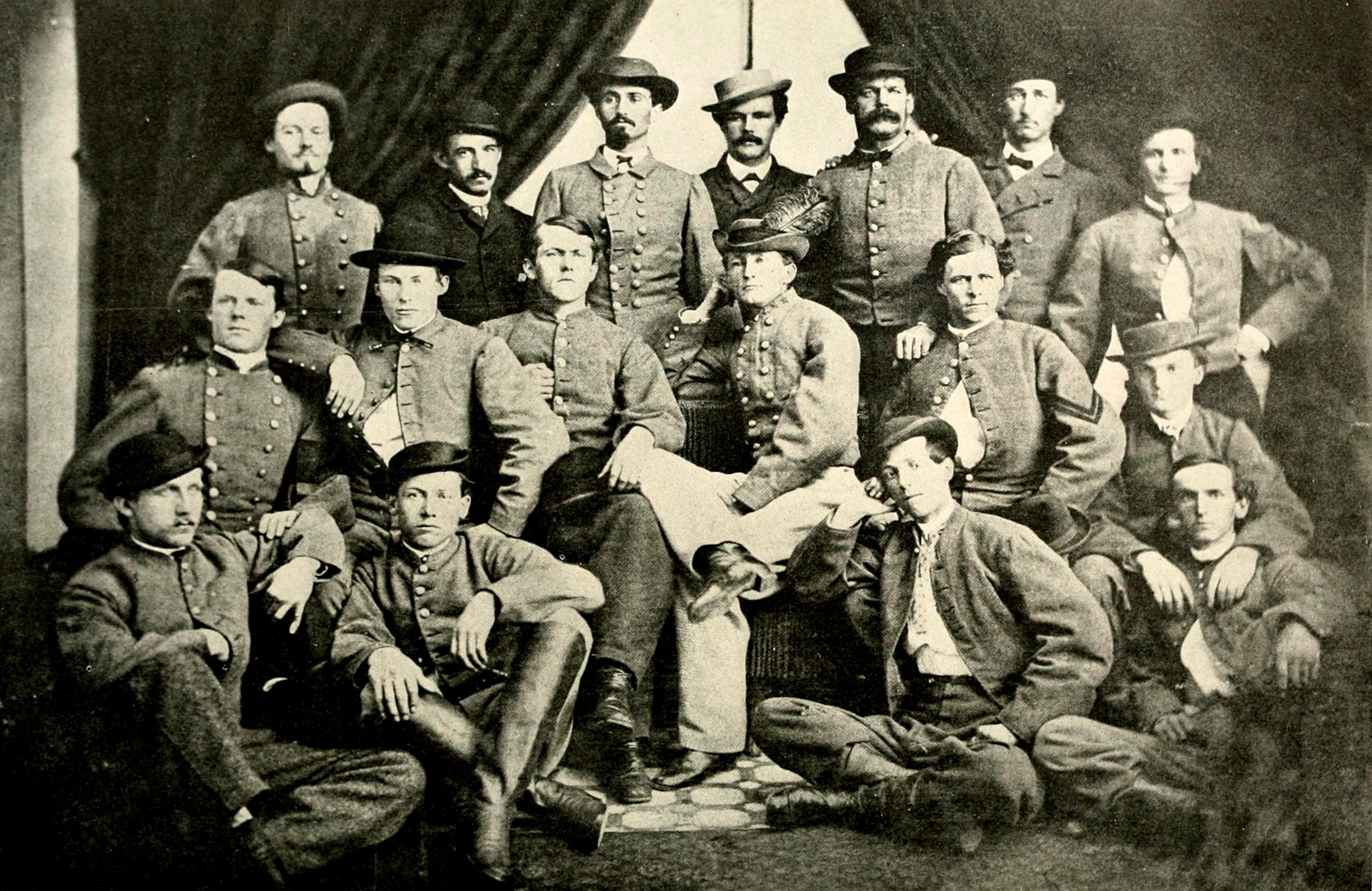
Colonel John S. Mosby 3rd from right center row

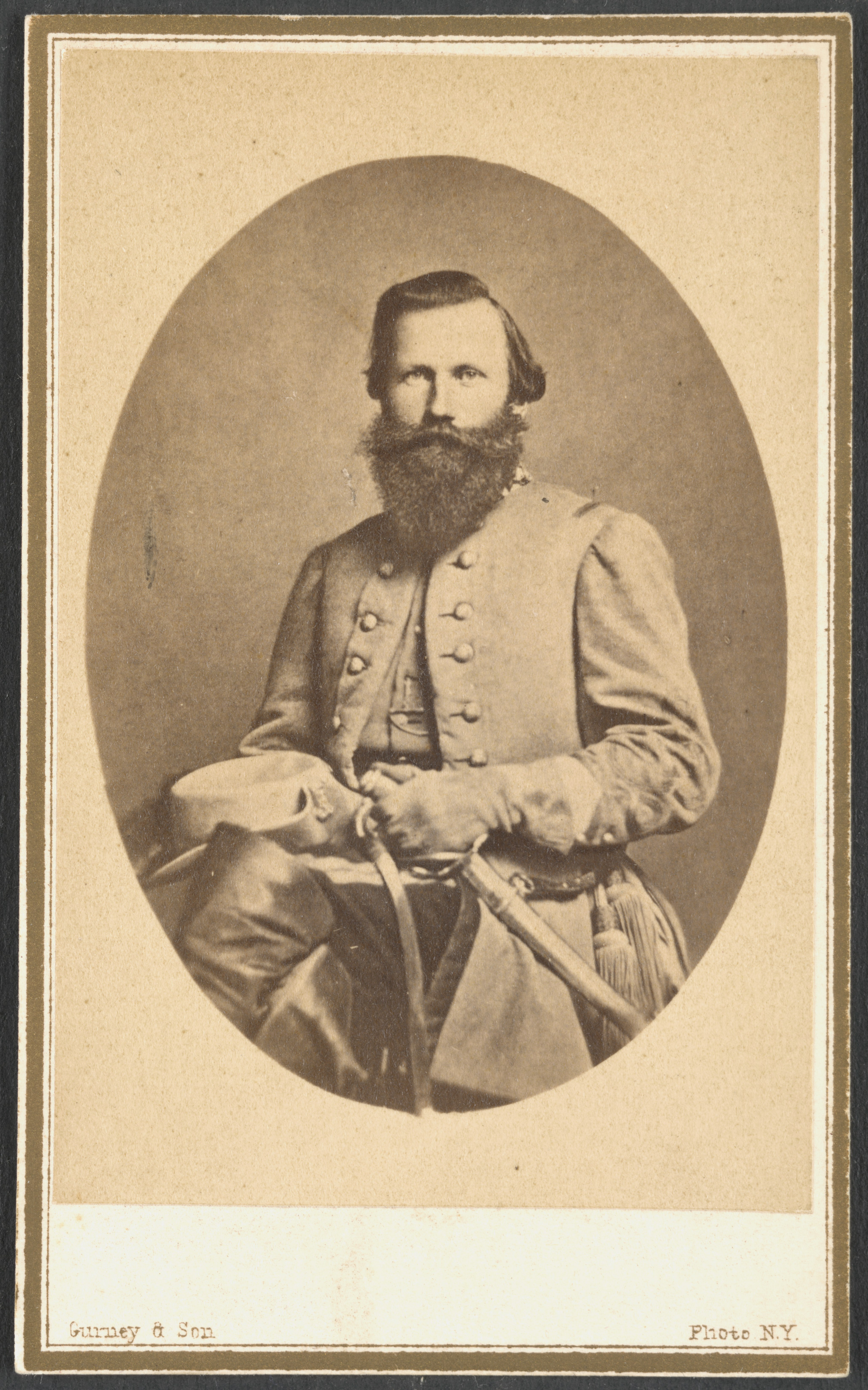
J. E. B. Stuart

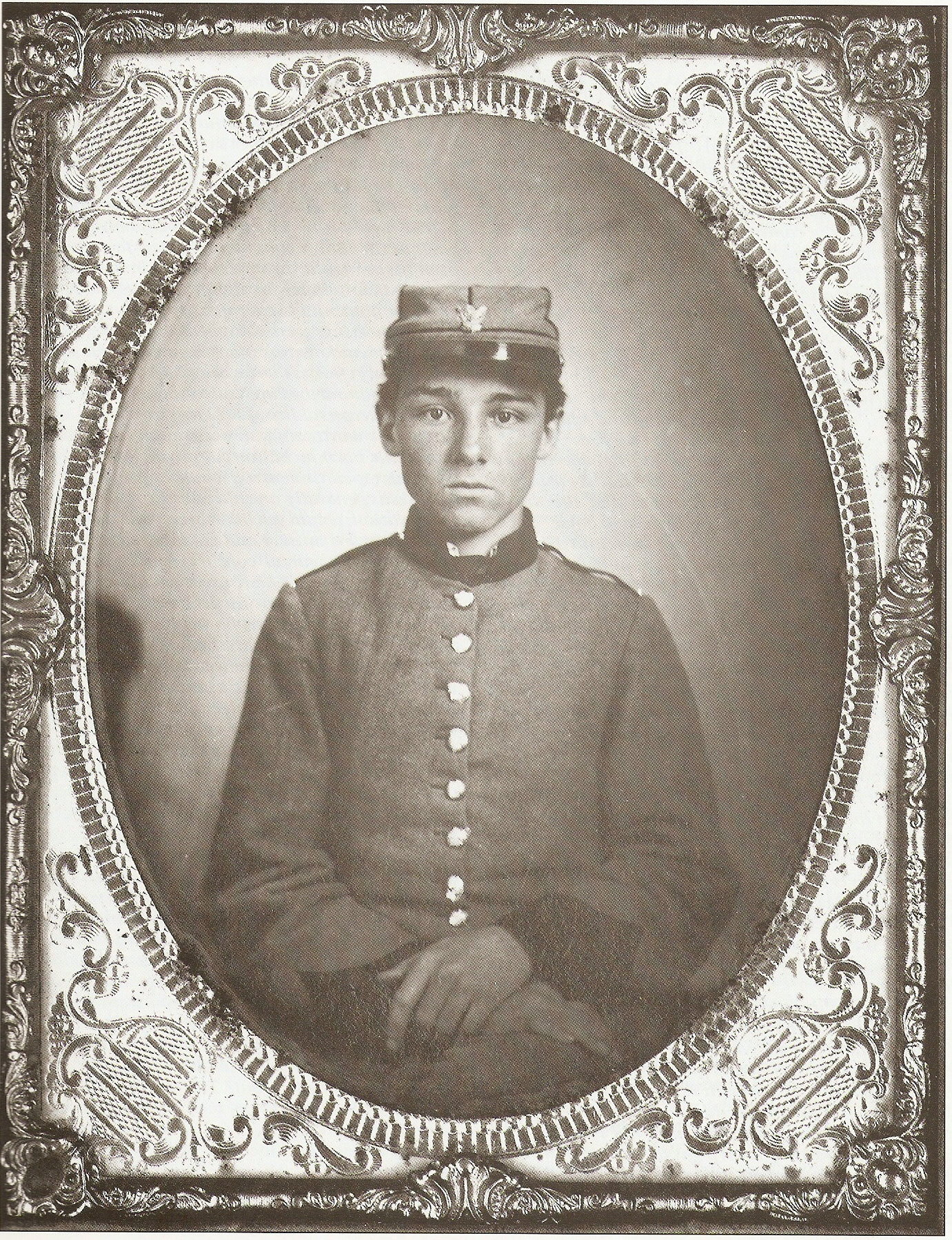
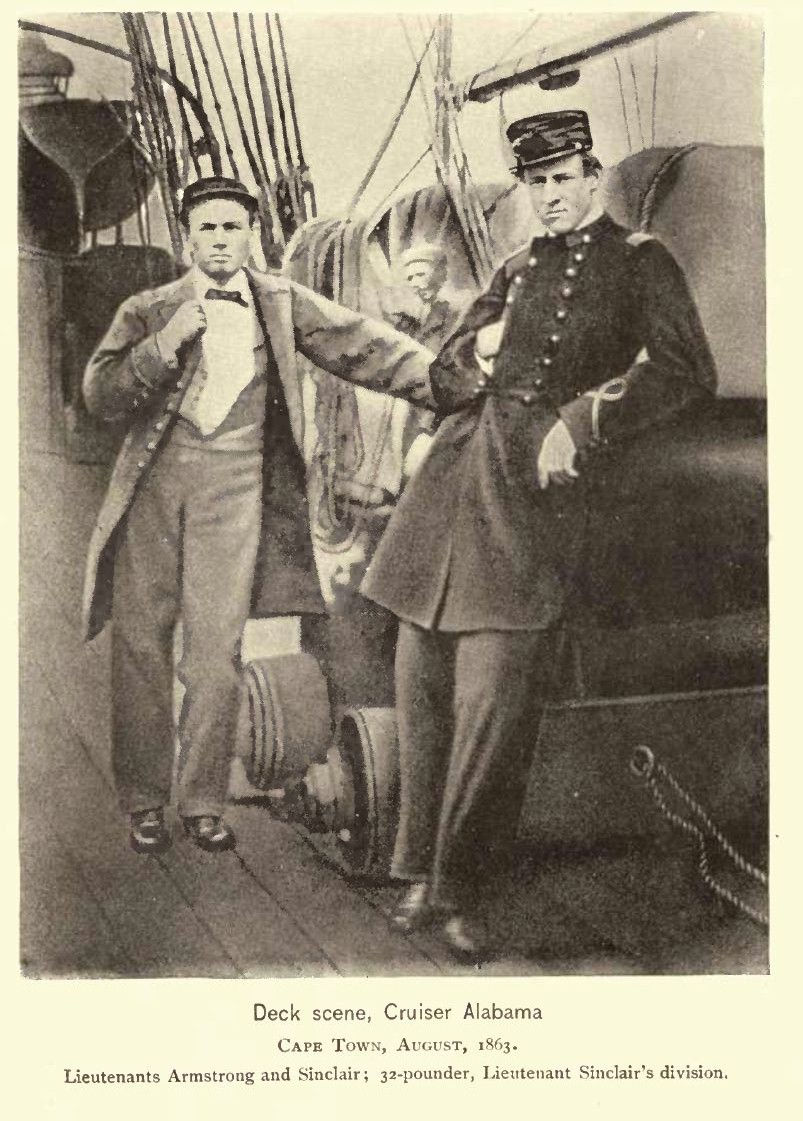
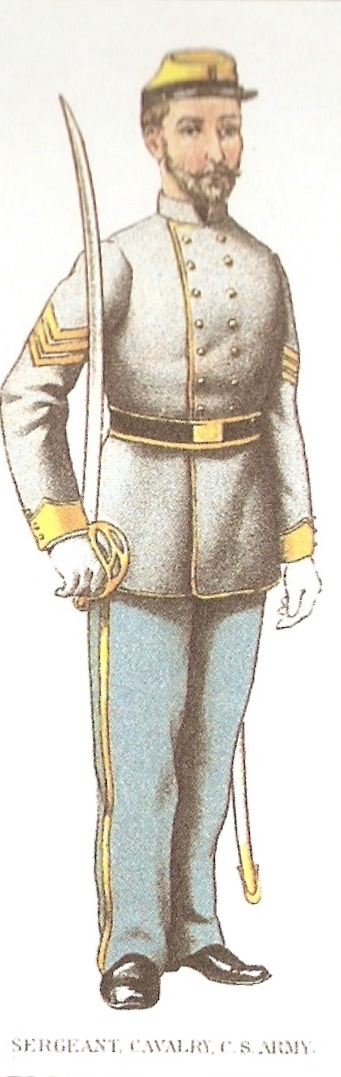
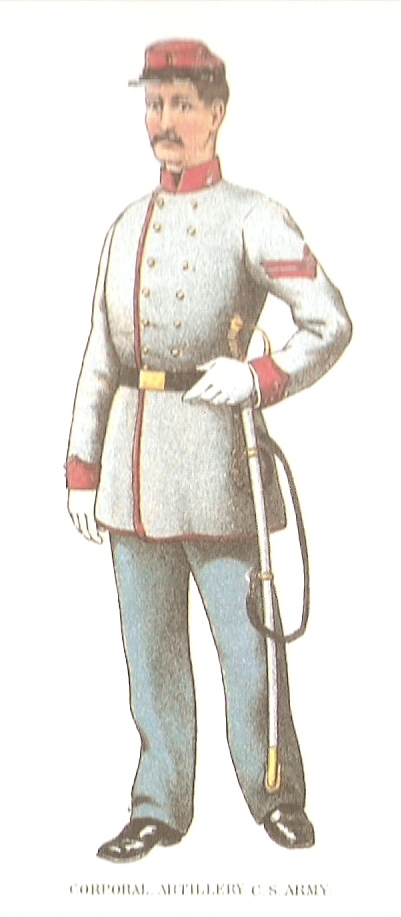
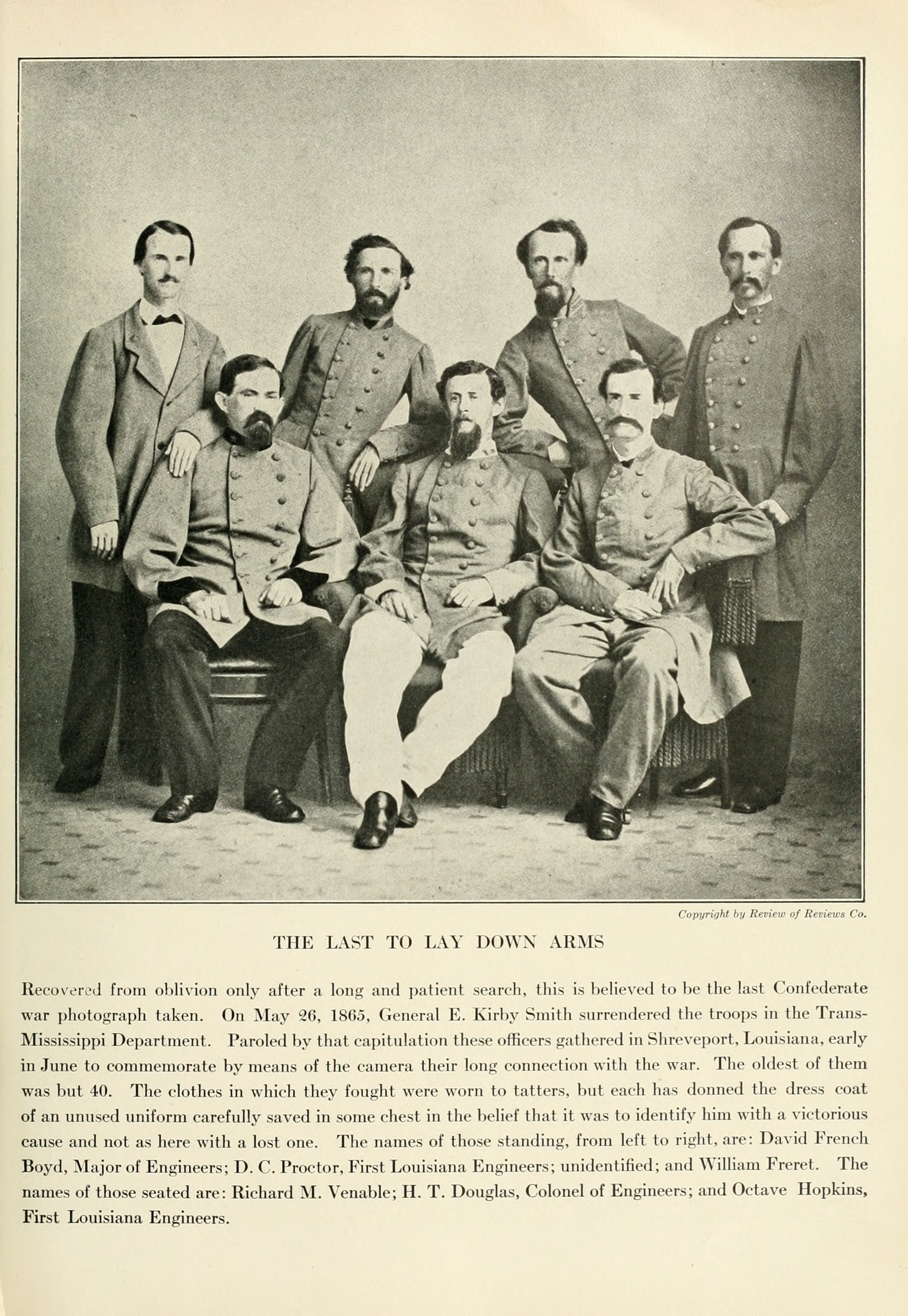
CSA Infantry	CSA Navy	CSA Cavalry	CSA Artillery	CSA Engineers
Confederate Infantry uniform, Private Edwin Francis Jemison, 2nd Louisiana Regiment, C.S.A. killed at Malvern Hill 1862	Confederate Navy uniform, Lieutenants Armstrong and Sinclair	Confederate Cavalry uniform, sergeant	Confederate Artillery uniform, corporal	June 1865 Photograph of captured and paroled officers of the 1st Louisiana Engineers CSA

=== General officers ===
==== Collar insignias and buttons ====
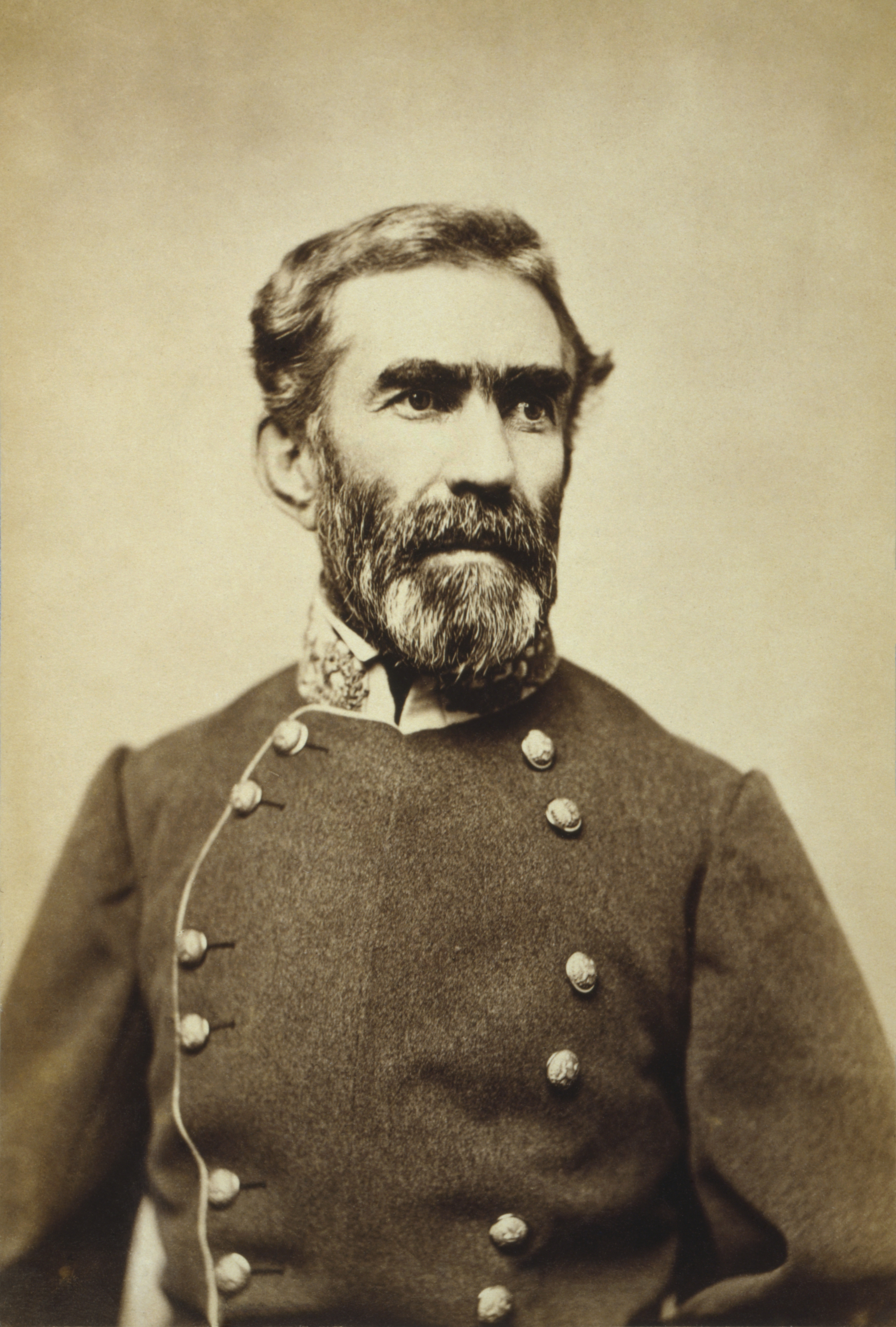
Braxton Bragg wearing one version of Three Gold Stars and Wreath on a General's Collar

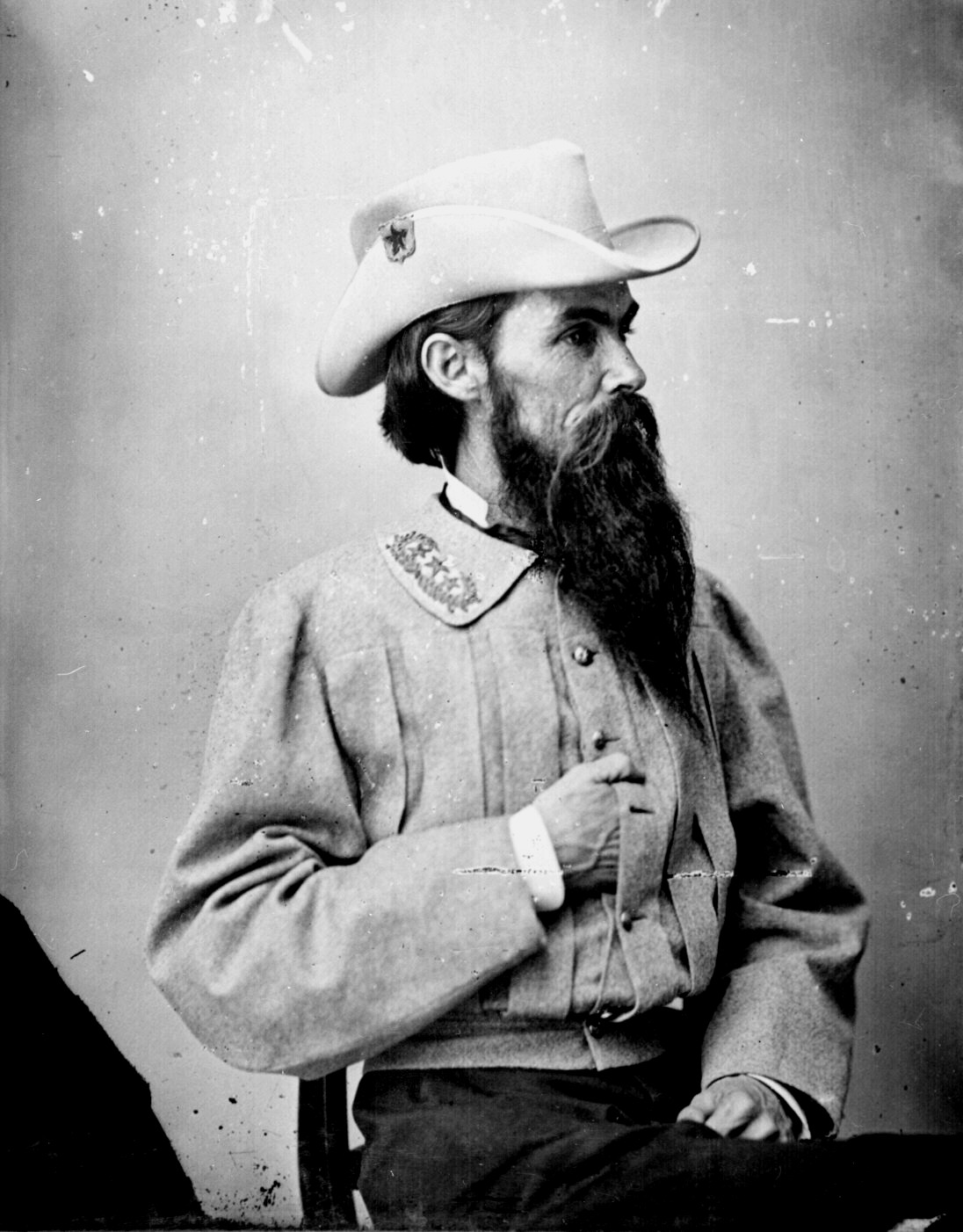
William Mahone wearing one version of Three Gold Stars and Wreath on a General's Collar

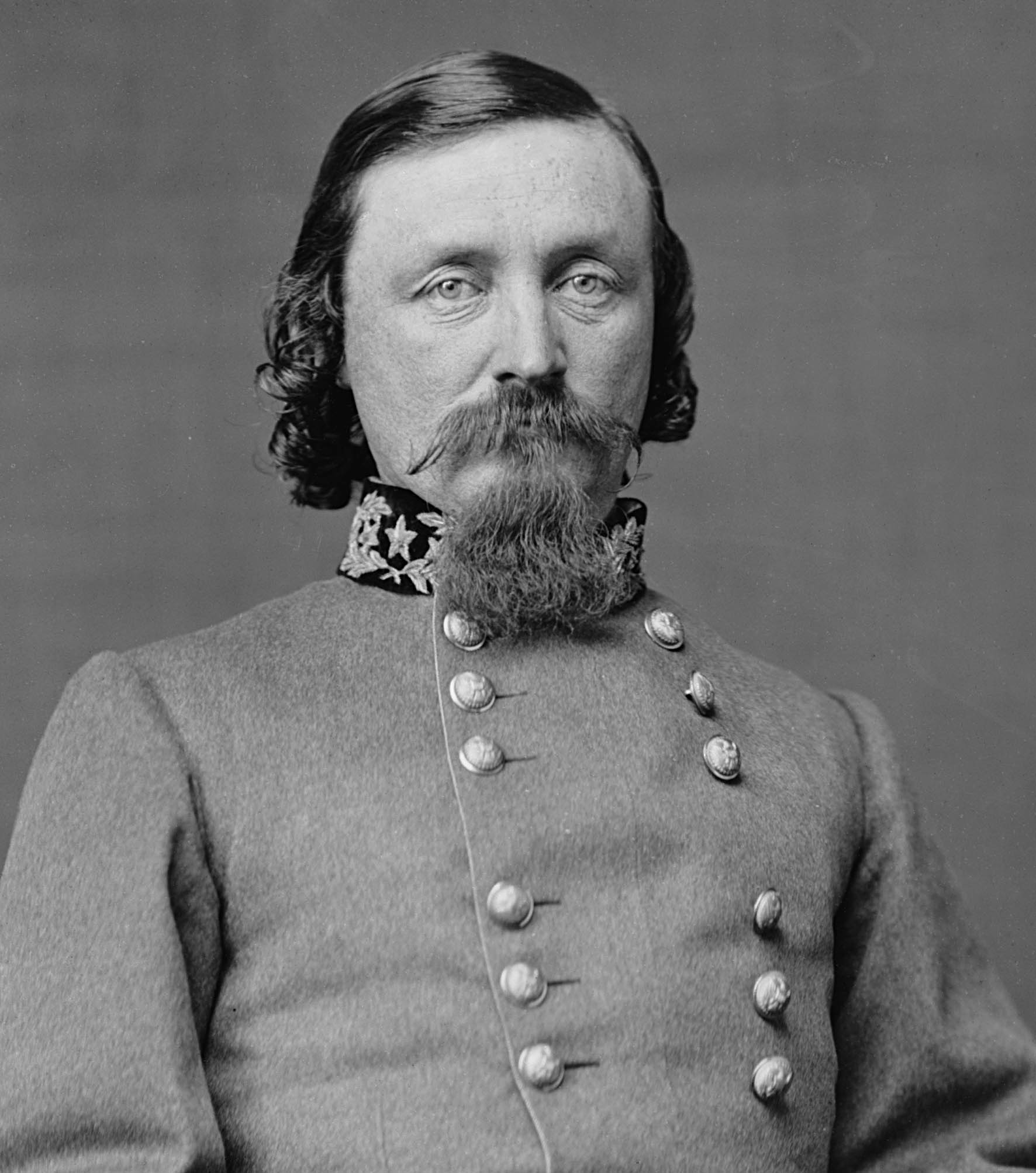
George Pickett wearing one version of Three Gold Stars and Wreath on a General's Collar

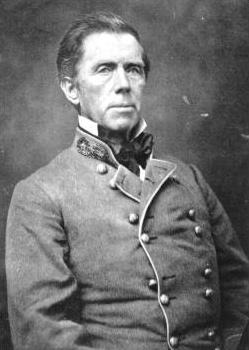
William "Extra Billy" Smith wearing one version of Three Gold Stars and Wreath on a General's Collar

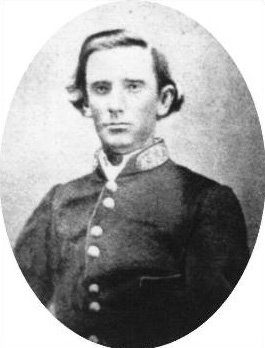
John Wharton wearing one version of Three Gold Stars and Wreath on a General's Collar

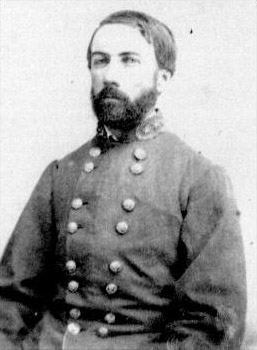
Daniel Harvey Hill wearing one version of Three Gold Stars and Wreath on a General's Collar

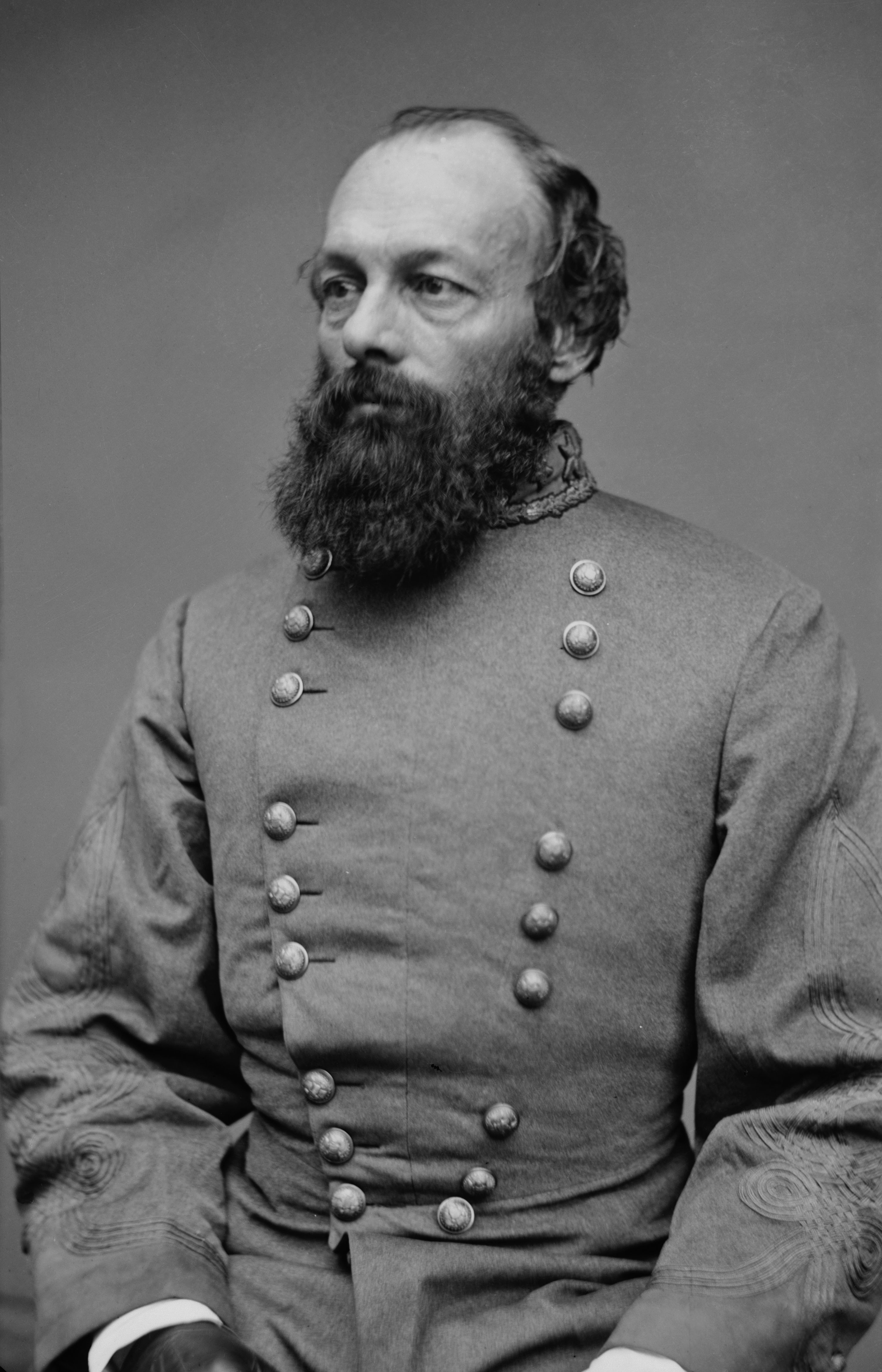
Edmund Kirby Smith wearing one version of Three Gold Stars and Wreath on a General's Collar

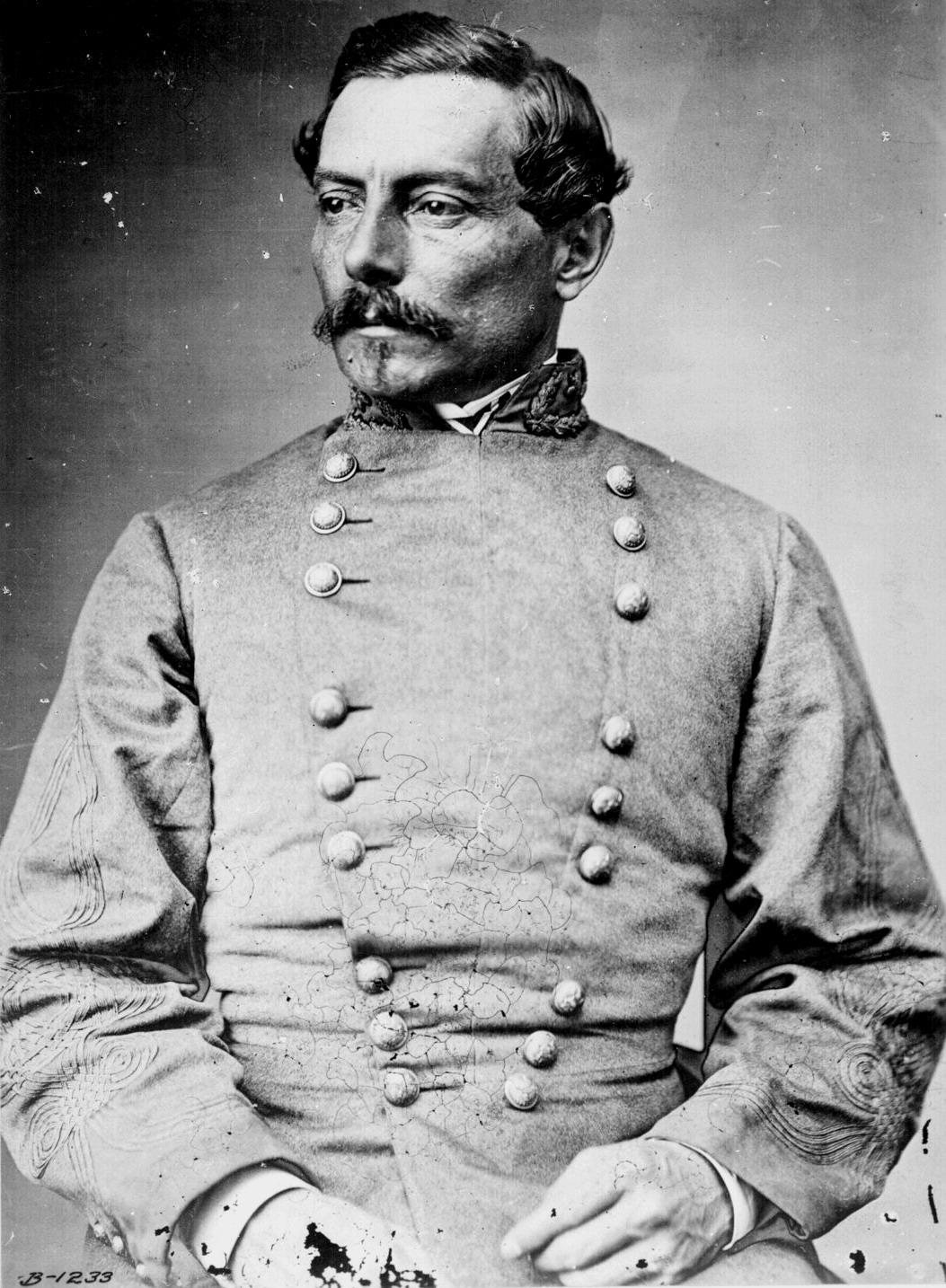
PGT Beauregard wearing one version of Three Gold Stars and Wreath on a General's Collar

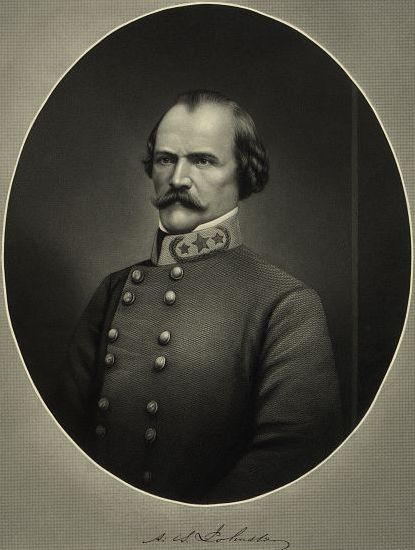
Albert Sidney Johnston wearing one version of Three Gold Stars and Wreath on a General's Collar

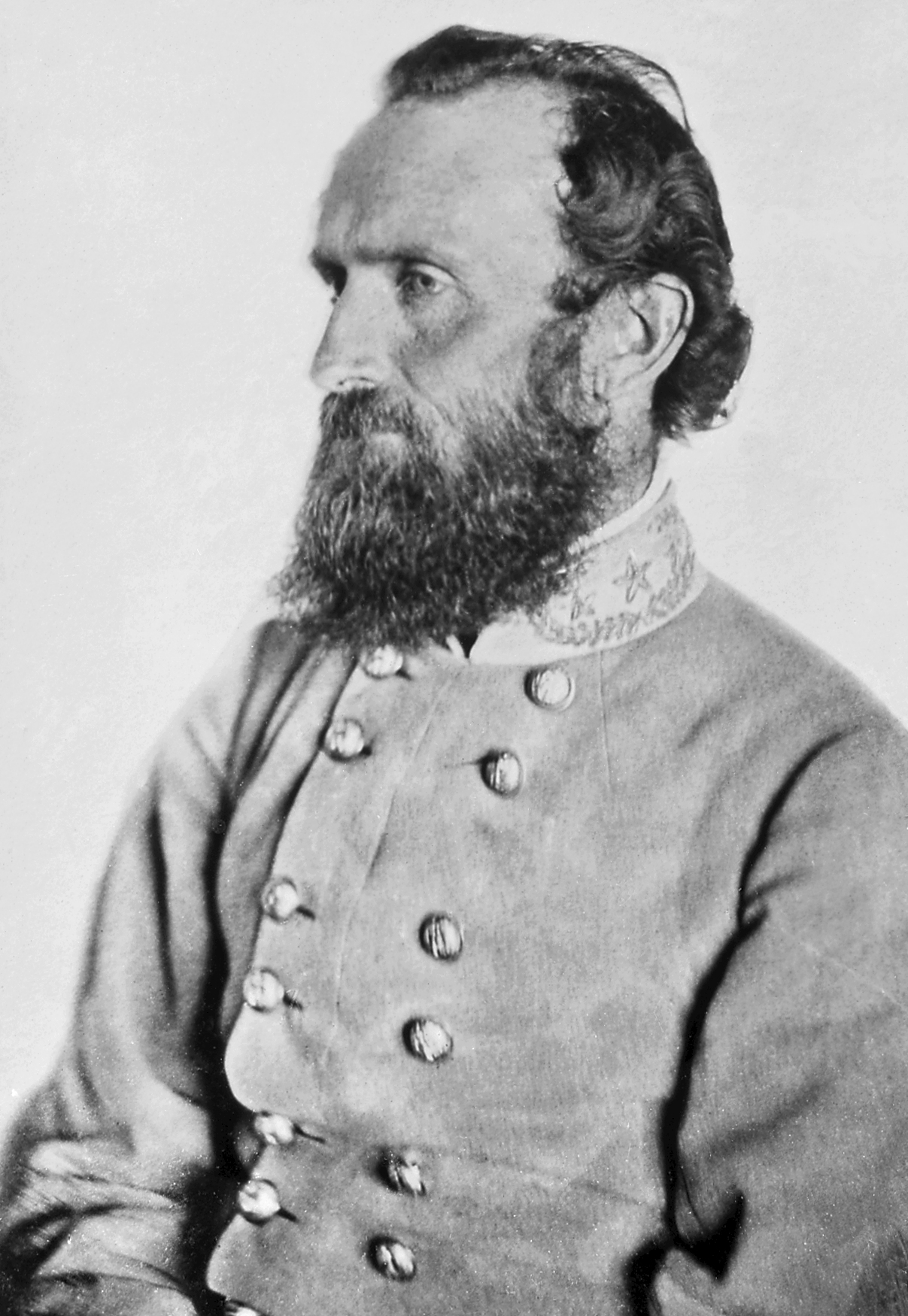
"Stonewall Jackson" Example of the Three Gold Stars and Wreath on a General's Collar

On the upright collar of full generals, lieutenant generals, major generals, and brigadier generals three stars were stitched within a wreath, all embroidered in gold coloring. The center star was slightly larger than the other stars. It was not possible to know which grade of general an officer was by his collar insignia. However, major generals and lieutenant generals wore two rows of nine buttons in groups of three down the front of the overcoat, and brigadier generals wore two rows of eight buttons in groups of two. However, Confederate Army Regulations had no distinction between the general officer grades, and had only the insignia for brigadier generals recognized. At least three general officers did not wear the prescribed uniform: Robert E. Lee, who wore the uniform of a colonel, refusing to wear a general's insignia until the Confederate victory; Joseph L. Hogg, who died of a fever; and Benjamin McCulloch.

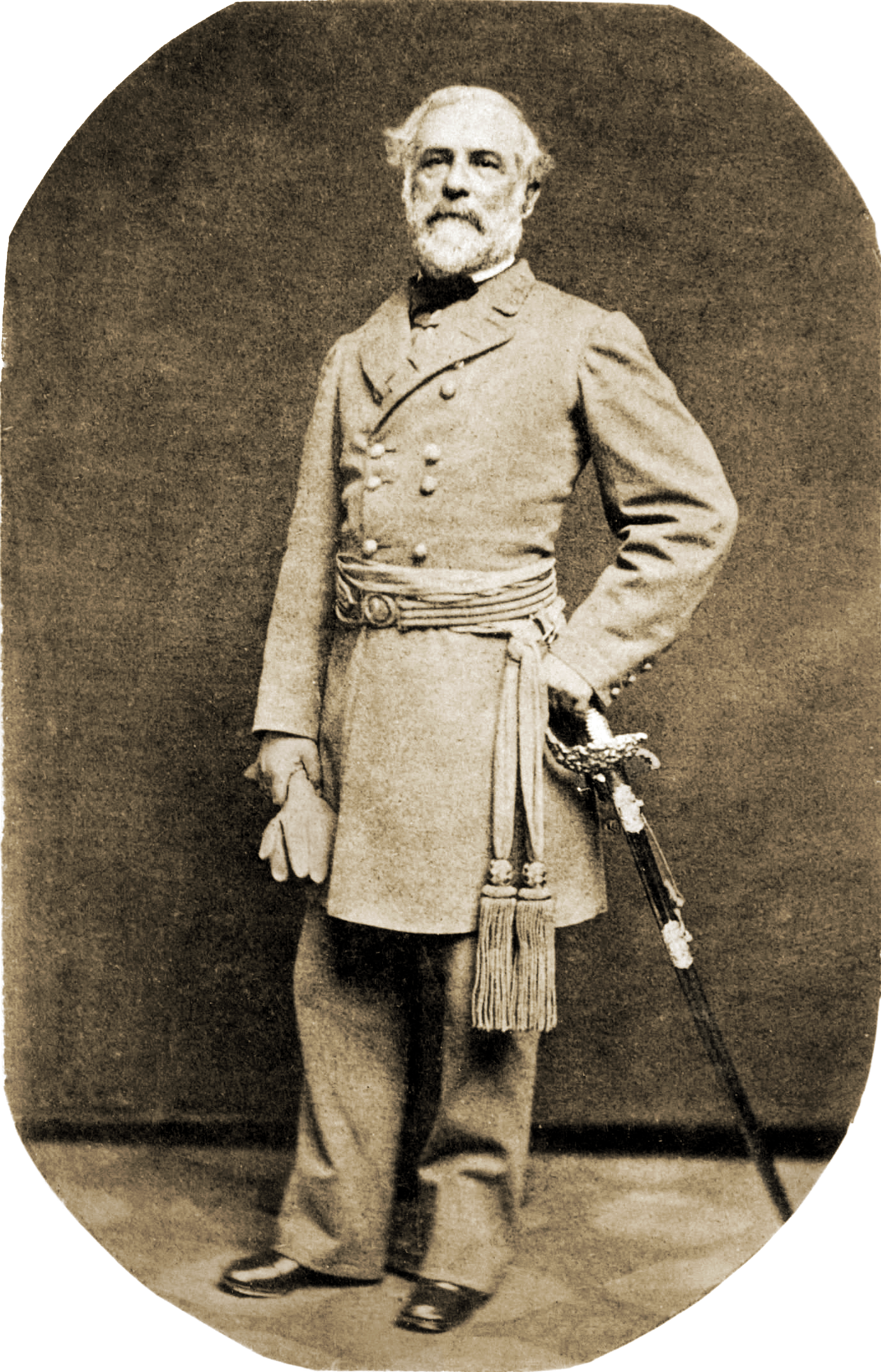
General Robert E. Lee wearing the 3 stars of a colonel

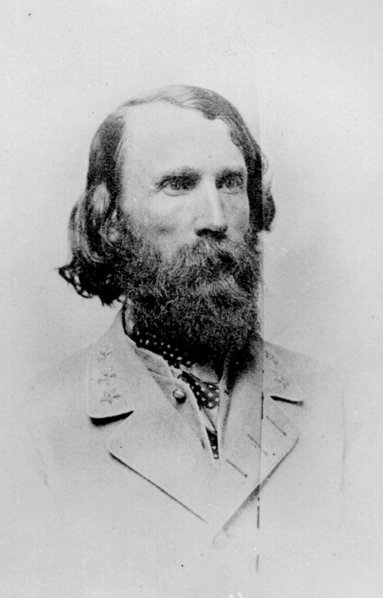
General A. P. Hill wearing the 3 stars of a colonel

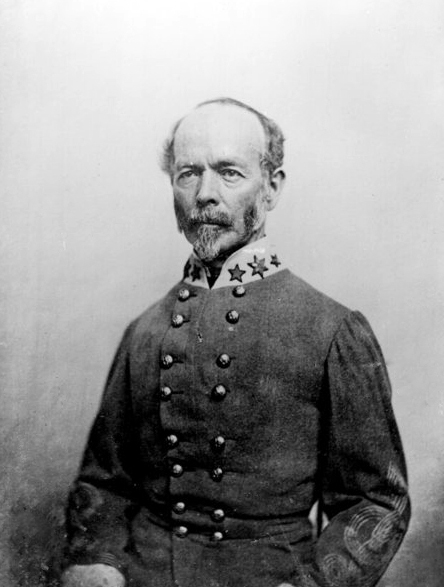
General Joseph E. Johnston wearing the 3 stars of a colonel

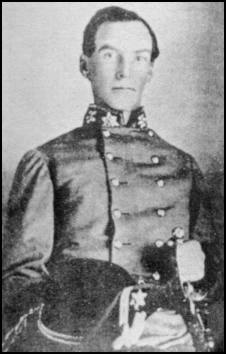
General Winfield Scott Featherston wearing the 3{?} stars of a colonel

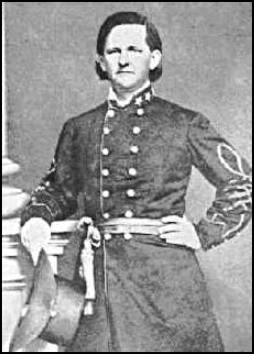
General Thomas R. R. Cobb wearing the 3 stars of a colonel

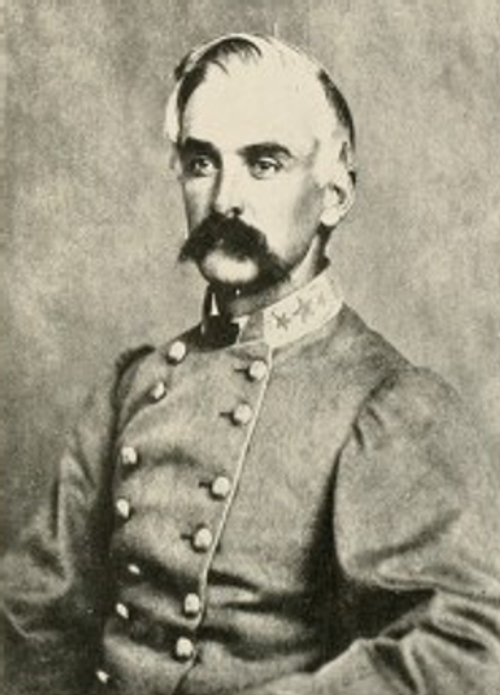
Colonel (Acting Brigadier General) Thomas Munford

=== Field and company officers ===
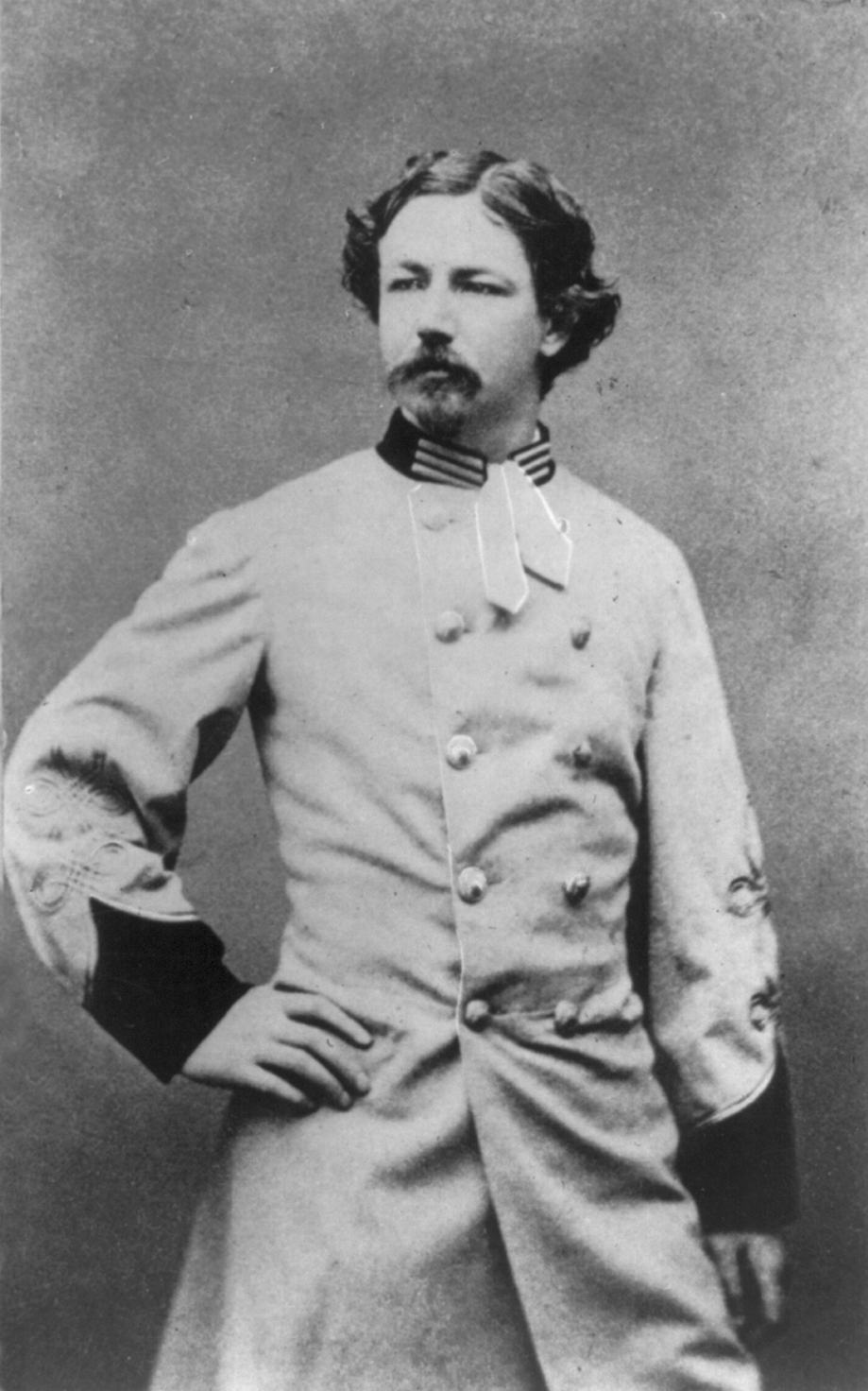
William McNeill Whistler of the 1st S.C.R.R.

==== Rank insignias ====
===== Collar insignias =====
Colonels wore three gold stars of the same size on their collar; the same as generals, but without the wreath. While lieutenant colonels wore two stars on their collars, majors wore one star, which was placed in the middle of the collar. Captains had three gold horizontal bars, first lieutenants wore two bars, and second lieutenants wore one bar. However, the Confederate Congress often created new commissions, and did not always standardize rank insignia immediately.

Collar insignias of the Confederate Army

General

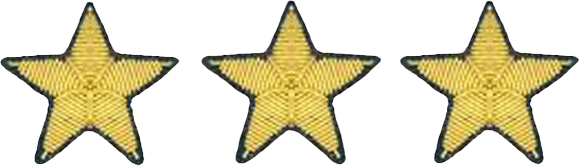
Colonel

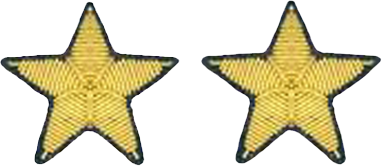
Lieutenant colonel

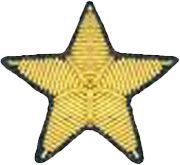
Major

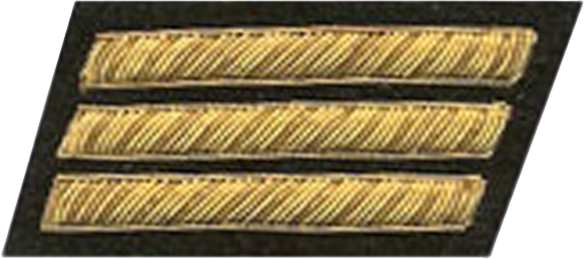
Captain

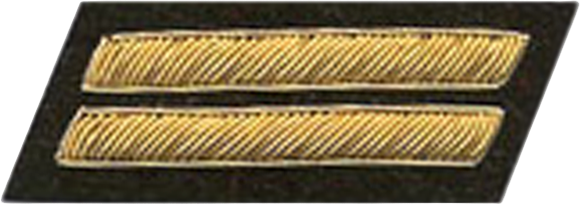
First lieutenant

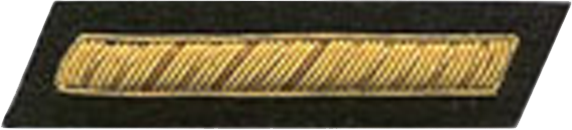
Second lieutenant

==== Sleeve insignias, branch of service colors ====
Confederate Army officers indicated their military affiliation with different colored facing on their coats or jackets. The branch colors were red for artillery, yellow for cavalry, light blue for infantry, and black for medical. A very distinctive feature of the Confederate officers' uniforms was the gold braid Austrian knots on their sleeves. More elaborate braiding indicated higher rank and some knots almost reached the shoulder. However, a general order, issued in 1862, called for the Austrian knots not to be worn in the field, as this made officers conspicuous to enemy combatants.

Collar and sleeve insignias of the Confederate military
General	Colonel (infantry)	Lieutenant colonel (staff or engineers)	Major (medical service)	Captain (CS Marines)	First lieutenant (artillery)	Second lieutenant (cavalry)

==== Buttons ====
Field grade officers, and company grade officers commonly wore two rows of seven equally spaced buttons each, despite regulations calling for the top two buttons to be spaced at four inches apart, coming closer together at the waist at 3 inches in distance.

==== Trousers ====
The Confederate trousers were very similar to those of the U.S. forces. Early on, the trousers were sky blue in color. They were most often made of wool, and were easily worn during long marches. If trousers did not arrive for the troops the soldiers would have to use their own pants to wear. Regimental and company officers wore the colors of their respective branch on the outer seam of their pants on one and one-quarter inch stripes. Generals wore two and five-eighths inch stripes on each pant leg. While the quartermasters, commissary, and engineer officers wore a single magenta, one and one-quarter inch outer-seam stripe. Non-commissioned officers were to wear on their outer seams a one and one-quarter inch cotton stripe or braid of colors appropriate to their army branch.

==== Kepis ====
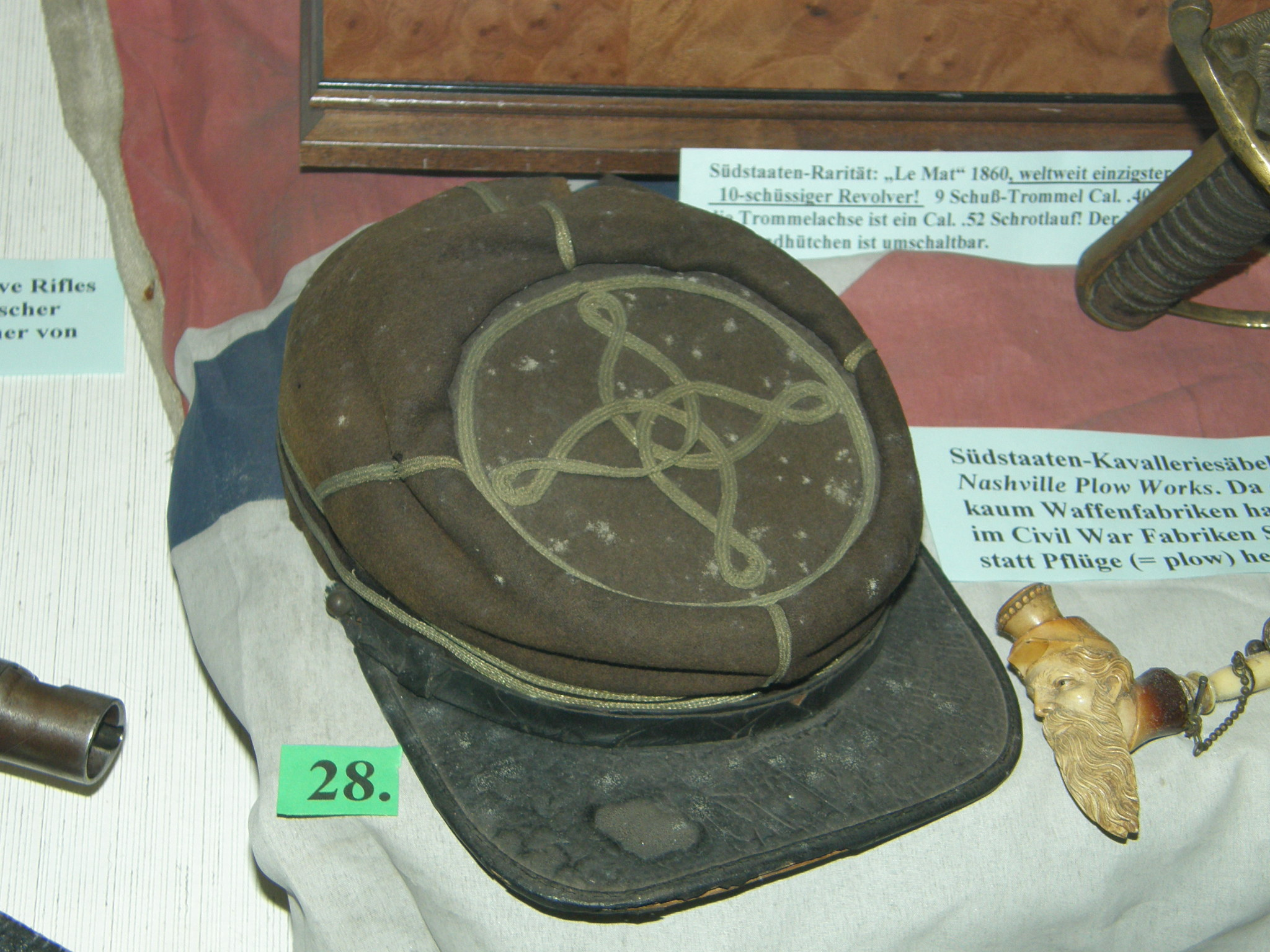
Butternut kepi in a German museum

The "African" pattern kepi was the standard issue headgear to all army personnel, with a dark blue band, sides and crown for generals, staff officers, and engineers. Kepis worn by commissioned officers and enlisted personnel had two patterns, specified by regulations in 1861 and 1862, respectively. The first pattern was a colored band, denoting the branch of service, with the crown and sides to be made of cadet gray cloth. The second pattern had a dark blue band for all branches, with the crown and sides colored according to the branch of service. The branch of service colors were as follows, red for artillery, yellow for cavalry, and light or sky blue for infantry.

Officer kepis of the Confederate military

General

Cavalry colonel

Infantry captain

Artillery lieutenant

=== Enlisted men ===
==== Rank insignias ====
===== Chevrons =====
In the Confederate Army, chevrons were worn by sergeants (three on each sleeve) and corporals (two on each sleeve)

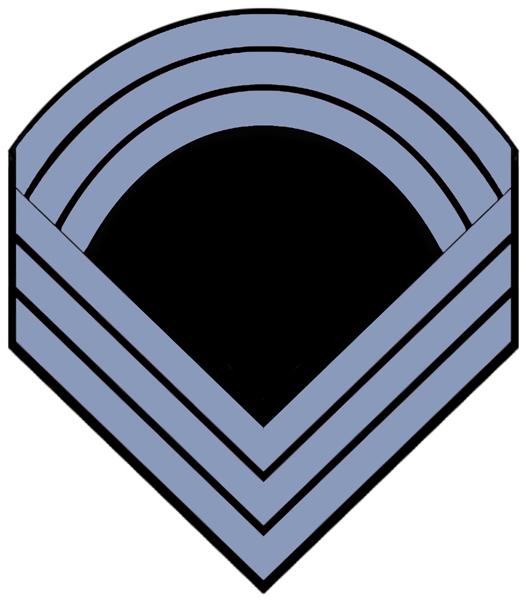
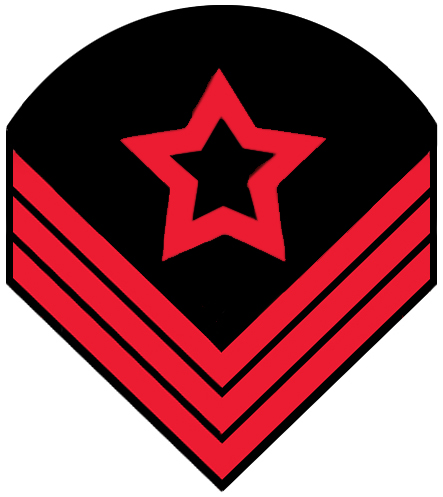
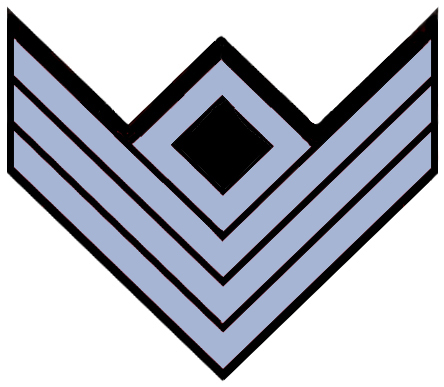
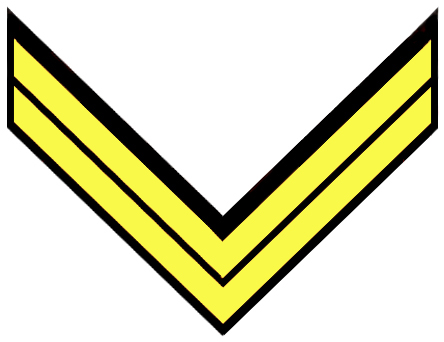
Chevrons of the Confederate military
Sergeant major	Quartermaster sergeant	Ordnance sergeant	First sergeant	Sergeant	Corporal	Musician	Private
						no insignia	no insignia

===== Sword and sash =====
When in full dress and sometimes also in battle, all ranks above corporal (i.e. all sergeants) in non-mounted service branches carried the M1840 NCO sword (when available) suspending on a leather belt (as did their counterparts in the U.S. Army, except hospital stewards who carried a special sword model). Additionally all CSA sergeant ranks were permitted worsted waist sashes: red for artillery and infantry (and all others service branches), but yellow for cavalry. (For their counterparts in the U.S. Army crimson worsted waist sashes for all service branches were only allowed to NCOs above sergeant (i.e. first sergeant, ordnance sergeant, hospital steward, sergeant major etc.))

==== Trousers ====
Army trousers were of similar pattern to the U.S. Army trousers, or civilian designs, depending on the area in which they were made. They were typically a shade of gray or brown, with a variety of medium blues also produced. The individual could also have them trimmed to reflect his militia unit, his Non-commissioned officer status, or as a personal flare, to the ubiquitous service pants. Noncommissioned officers were to wear on their outer seams a one and one-quarter inch cotton stripe or braid of colors appropriate to their army branch.

==== Belt ====
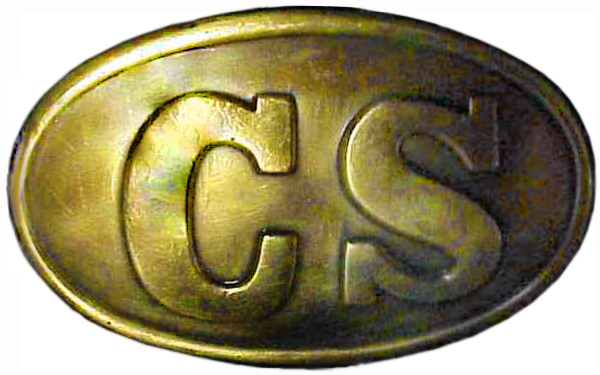
Example of a CS belt buckle

There were numerous types of belts produced for the Confederate military during the Civil War. There were literally dozens of types of buckles used and produced by or for the Confederacy. The buckles ranged from single plates with hooks, to two piece interlocking buckles, to simple roller buckles and countless other variations. Many buckles use plates that bore the state seal or motto of their home states. The vast majority used simple roller buckle plates of the type found on a common dog collar. As the war progressed, more and more men used captured U.S. belt plates, often wearing them upside down.

=== Infantry ===
==== Design ====
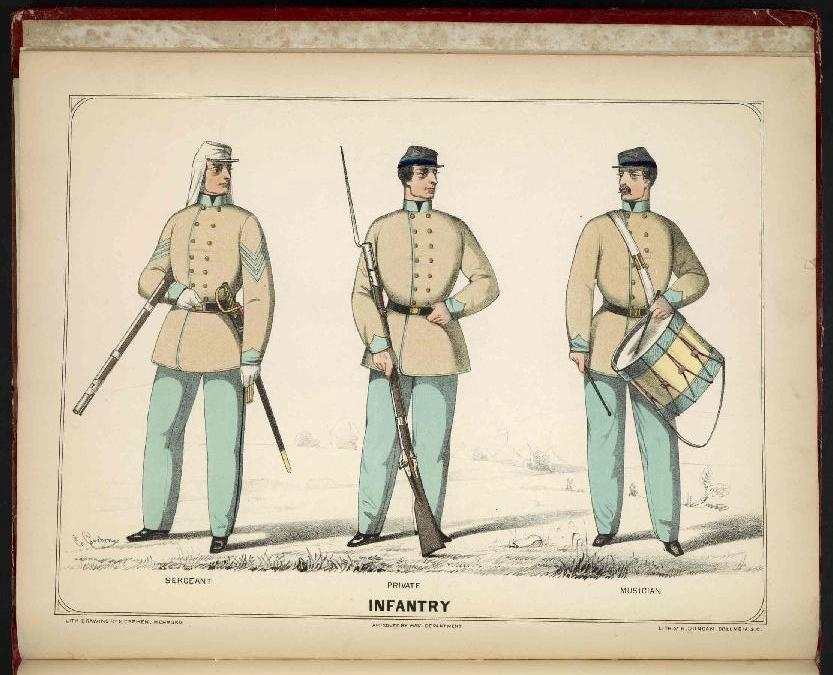
Infantry uniform according to the 1861 uniform regulations

The Confederate Infantry, the largest Corps of the Army, had a large variety of uniforms, and the greater amount of records. The initial Confederate Army uniform consisted of a kepi, double-breasted tunic, trousers, and Jefferson bootees/brogans. The kepi was not specified until the 1862 Regulations, as a sky-blue kepi, reflecting the Infantry Corps, with a dark blue band, and leather visor. The tunic was to be of cadet gray, with two rows of yellow-metal (brass or gold) buttons, 'solid' cuff and collar facings in sky-blue, and lined with a lighter gray fabric. The coat was of the same pattern specified as regulation for the field and company officers, as well as for the artillery and cavalry enlisted men.

These designs for the uniform, however, did not prevail, as the complexity of the uniform proved to be difficult for mass-production. The simpler uniform turned out to be the regulations dictated by Judah Benjamin. He stated that the uniform should be that of: a gray jacket; a blue, gray, or brown pair of trousers; any slouch hat or cap-type of head cover; and any kind of foot-wear to be worn for Confederate service in mid-1861. His regulations, however, were overruled by the subsequent set of regulations of June 1861, stating the Franco-Austrian styled uniform to be issued and purchased to all corps and by all officers, respectively.

The guidelines set by Judah Benjamin in 1861 soon became the choice of the clothing depots across the South as the war went into its second year. This easier-to-produce jacket, with the loosened hat and trouser regulations, made it easier to clothe Confederate infantrymen. The typical uniform by the end of 1861 and beginning of 1862 was a slouch hat or kepi, a shell-jacket, and a pair of sky-blue or gray cloth trousers, with brogans.

==== Jackets and coats ====
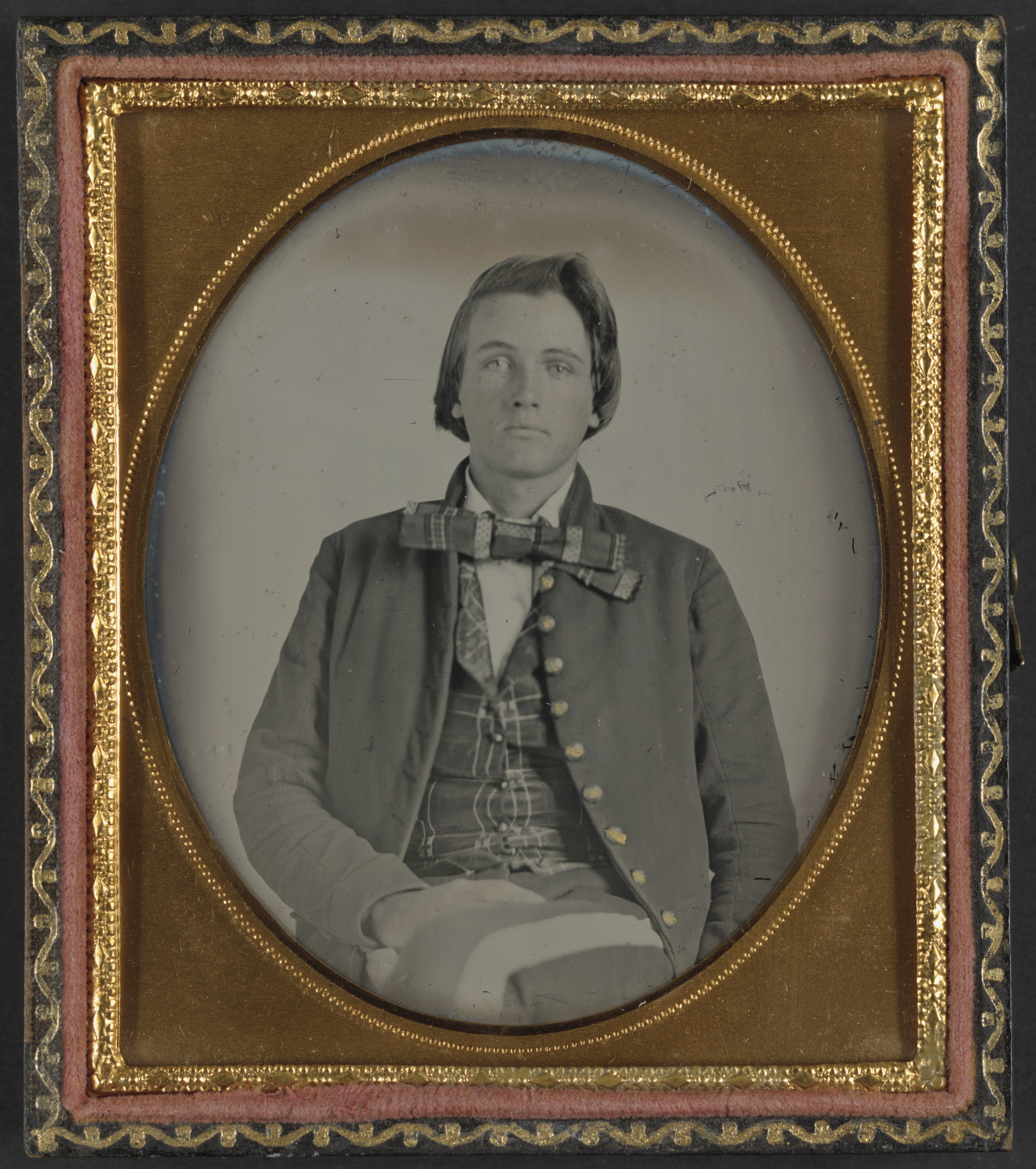
Unidentified soldier in Confederate nine-button frock coat

The jacket prescribed for infantry use was of the same design for all service men. The design itself depended entirely on the region, time, and the source of fabrics. The Eastern Theater uniform jacket was the Richmond Depot design, with three primary types issued throughout the war. The jacket varied from a cadet gray, piped and trimmed jacket, looking much like a pre-war militia jacket, to the jeans-cloth jacket that was worn out in six months. The materials and uniforms imported from England were also issued to the troops through this facility. The Western and Deep Southern facilities manufactured similar uniforms, being jeans-cloth, dyed with vegetable based grays, that would fade to brown or tan. The typical jackets issued had 5-7 button fronts, with collar and cuff trim that varied from era, region and source, and an outside pocket on occasion.

The previous styles were the militia uniforms. These consisted of everything from the more sharp-looking jackets and coats, which resembled the French or Northern Infantry uniforms, to the no-flares "battle-shirt", meant for drilling and battles only. The uniform for these militia units varied by each company through a single county or parish, let alone the country itself. The militia uniforms were a menagerie of colors, from cadet gray, dark blue, and hunter green, to reds, buffs and gold tones. The other variety of CS Army uniform jackets and coats was the Zouave. This jacket was meant to be loose-fitting and reflect the French-African Zouave units. There were several units wearing variations of this uniform, including the "Richmond Zouaves" of the 44th Virginia Infantry Regiment, the "Louisiana Tigers" in the 1st Louisiana Special Battalion, and "Coppen's Zouaves" of Louisiana.

==== Buttons ====
The buttons worn on the Infantryman's clothing is not as minor a detail as it would sound. The average infantryman may have had his uniform made for him in Richmond, Virginia; however, if the man had enlisted in Georgia, and is now marching through the former state. In reflection to his loyalties to home, this man, for example, could have adorned his uniform with Georgia State buttons. This would indicate to his fellow soldiers his allegiance to both his state and his military unit. This was common practice during the war for both sides in the conflict.

The regulation infantry buttons for enlisted men described the button as to have a number on the front to reflect the unit designation; for example, a soldier in the 1st Confederate Infantry Regiment would have a "1" on the buttons of his coat. These buttons are rare or non-existent. However, the officer's regulation button, consisting of the "block I" button, for Infantry, the A for Artillery, etc.; was very common amongst soldiers, and replaced the efforts to produce the different, numbered buttons for each regiment in service.

As before, the uniform buttons could also reflect the state loyalties of an individual. All of the Confederate States made an effort to supply their respective State buttons to their troops. The states that did not join the Confederacy, but had men within its ranks, such as Maryland and Missouri, also made buttons, that have turned up on surviving uniforms.

The Confederacy also implemented ready-made supplies of button, consisting of the U.S. Government stockpiles throughout the war. These consisted of the Enlisted men's coat button, (an eagle with the shield of the U.S., with the olive branch and arrows held in its talons,) and the officer's buttons, (the same as before, but the shield is replaced by a blank shield, with the respective letter for each branch of service, I for infantry, A for artillery, C for cavalry, and D for dragoons).

==== Hats and kepis ====
The headgear of the typical Confederate Infantryman was the slouch hat, or the military Kepi. The Kepi is a short fatigue and dress cap that was easy to manufacture for the Army during the war. This type of hat had its drawbacks, however. It provided little weather protection, and was worn out easily after a few months of hard wear. The Infantryman design cap was sky-blue with a dark blue band, but this was rarely seen outside of officer private-purchase caps. More typical would be the plain gray/brown cap, with or without the branch of service trim. There are examples of deep-south made caps that were trimmed in red cotton and wool, and issued to Infantry units, showing that any available clothing was issued to the troops as the war progressed.

The slouch hat was the preferred choice of many soldiers, including officers. The hat was normally a floppy, wide brimmed, woolen body head-cover, meant to protect the individual from the sun, and inclement weather. It was normally a civilian hat, of brown, gray, or black wool. This simple hat saw widespread use throughout the Confederate Armies, and even with U.S. Army personnel. Occasionally, the hat was adorned with insignia of the wearer's preference, and may have been pinned up for the drill in the use of the regular weapon of the time, the Rifled-musket.

=== Cavalry ===
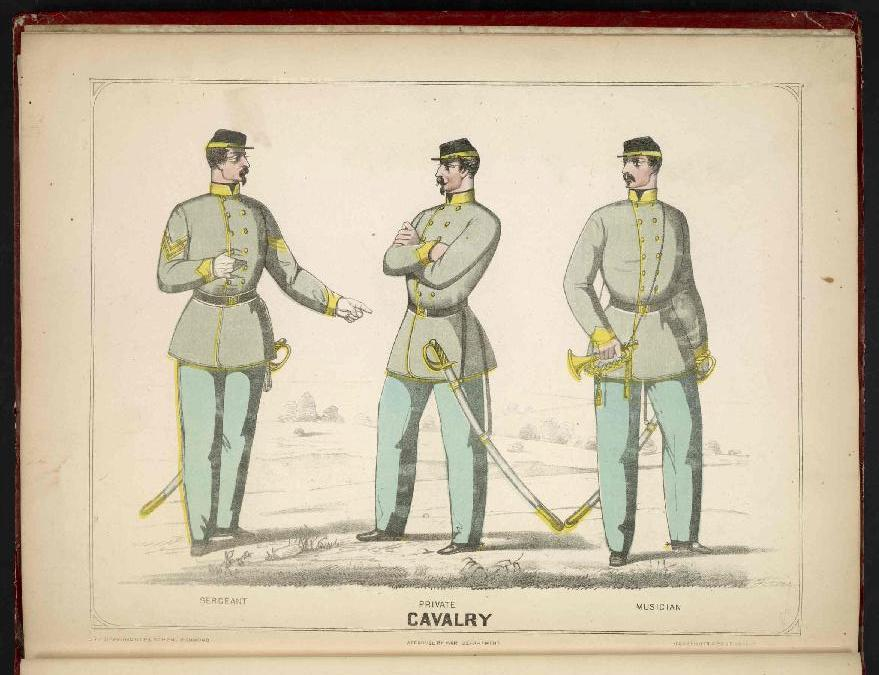
Cavalry uniforms in accordance with the 1861 uniform regulations

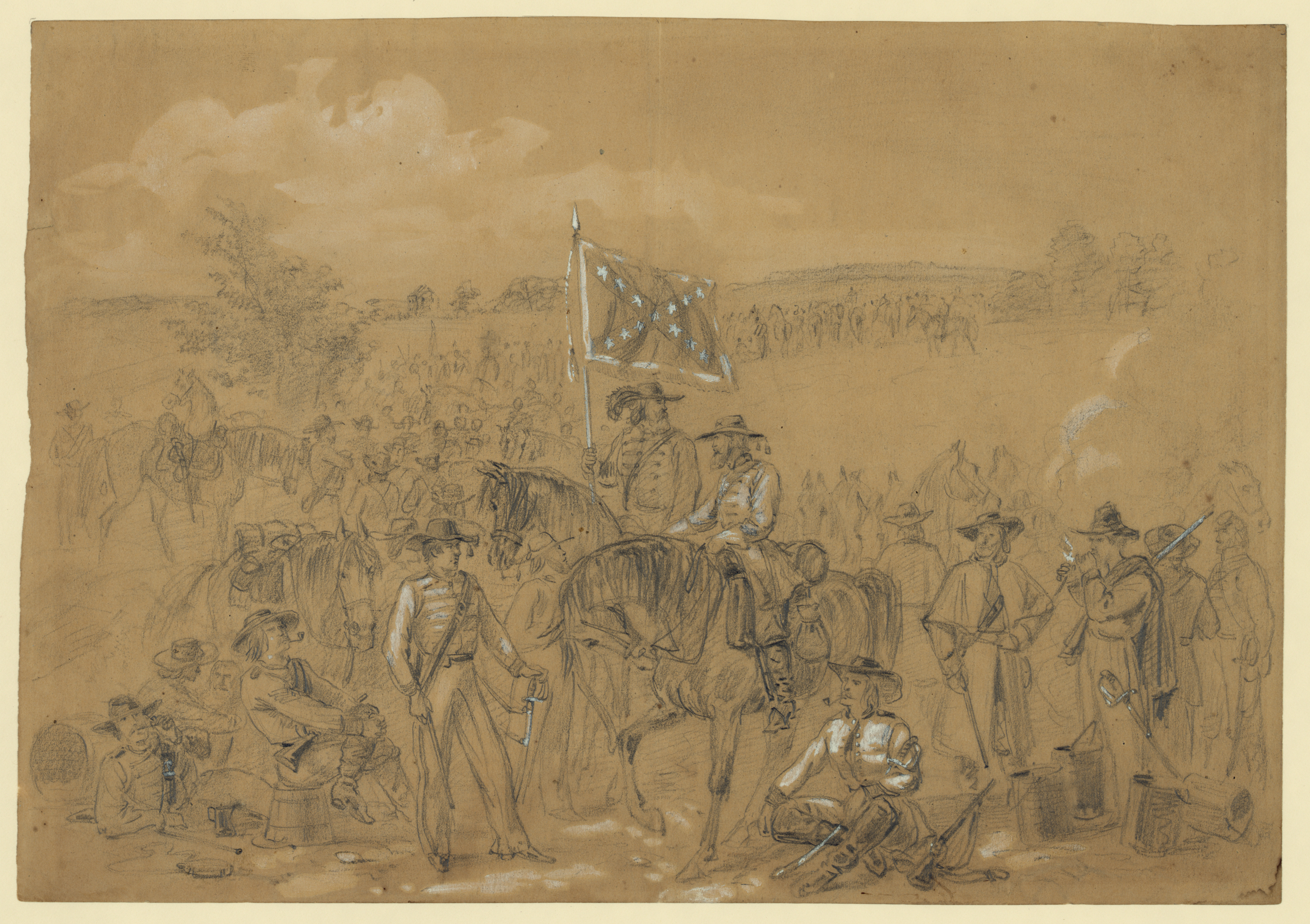
Example of a Confederate cavalryman wearing the stag hat (depiction of the 1st Virginia Cavalry)

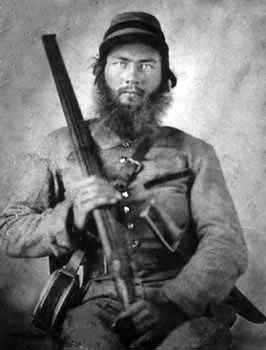
Confederate cavalryman John Duponte of Dartmouth, Alabama with muzzle-loading shotgun and a "Square D" handle Bowie knife

==== Design ====
The first of the Cavalry uniforms were made by the cavalrymen themselves. By 1862, the Confederate regulations ordered the uniform to become organized, being cadet gray and lined with a thin layer around the sleeve. The pant legs were light blue with a yellow strip rising from the bottom of the leg to the top. Non-commissioned officers of the cavalry wore either regular clothes from home or a variety of different types of uniforms. yellow was the prescribed branch of service color, but surviving uniforms show beyond a doubt that the vast majority of cavalrymen who used any branch of service color, used buff as yellow cloth was virtually non existent in the Confederacy.

==== Buttons ====
According to the June 1861 regulations, and later the 1862 and 1863 regulations, enlisted men were to wear a frock coat with the same button pattern as the Company and Field Grade officers. Each coat had 2 columns of buttons with 7 buttons in each column.

==== Hats ====
A cap copying the French Kepi was the prescribed headgear for all three branches of the land service, adorned with the various branch of service colors, but Confederates preferred the slouch hat and surviving photographs show that as many or more men wore some type of slouch hat than wore the prescribed cap, especially as the War progressed.

The Troiani book says, "Although in some units hats seem dominate, the issuance of caps was widespread. For example, requisitions for the 19th Alabama Infantry throughout 1863 and early 1864 show a decided preference for hats, whereas those for the 17th Mississippi Infantry for the same period record only caps being received. One Confederate clothing facility in Charleston, South Carolina, was devoted entirely to the manufacture of caps. These were cut out by government employees at the depot and sent to 1,000 to 1,500 local "persons of a needy class" for assembly."

=== Artillery ===
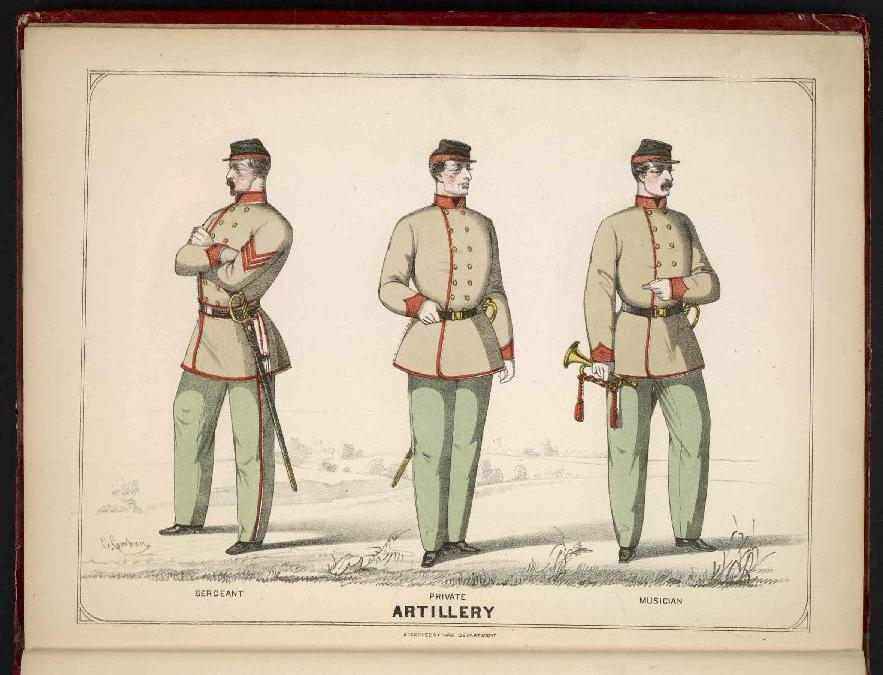
Artillery uniform in accordance with the 1861 uniform regulations

==== Design ====
The first of the Artillery uniforms were a variety of handmade and personally customized uniforms. By 1862, the Confederate uniforms became organized. They became cadet gray and were to be lined with a layer of red around the sleeve. The pants legs were light blue. Even after the uniforms were organized many of the artillerymen wore regular clothes due to the heat and discomfort caused by the regular uniforms.

==== Buttons ====
In the Confederate Artillery, a normal junior officer had two rows of seven evenly spaced buttons, grouped into pairs, while a senior officer could have as many as eight buttons in two rows.

==== Caps ====
The kepi was also standard issue to the artillerymen, they were made red to match that of the rest of their uniforms. During the summer months they were also allowed to wear straw hats because of the heat.

== Confederate States Navy ==
=== Design ===
Confederate States Navy Department

The first of the Navy uniforms were made in dark blue, but with the Southern style of rank insignia for the officers. The 1862 Confederate regulations ordered the uniform to be steel gray and lined with a dark black silk serge. They were also made in medium gray and cadet gray. They were made of wool, and these uniforms were not fit for the heat of the lower decks of a ship. Petty officers wore a variety of uniforms, or even regular clothing.

Confederate States Navy Sea Officers Insignia
Insignia location	Admiral	Captain	Commander	Lieutenant	Master	Passed midshipman	Midshipman
Sleeves							
Shoulder; Straps							(none)
Cover							

=== Shoulder straps ===
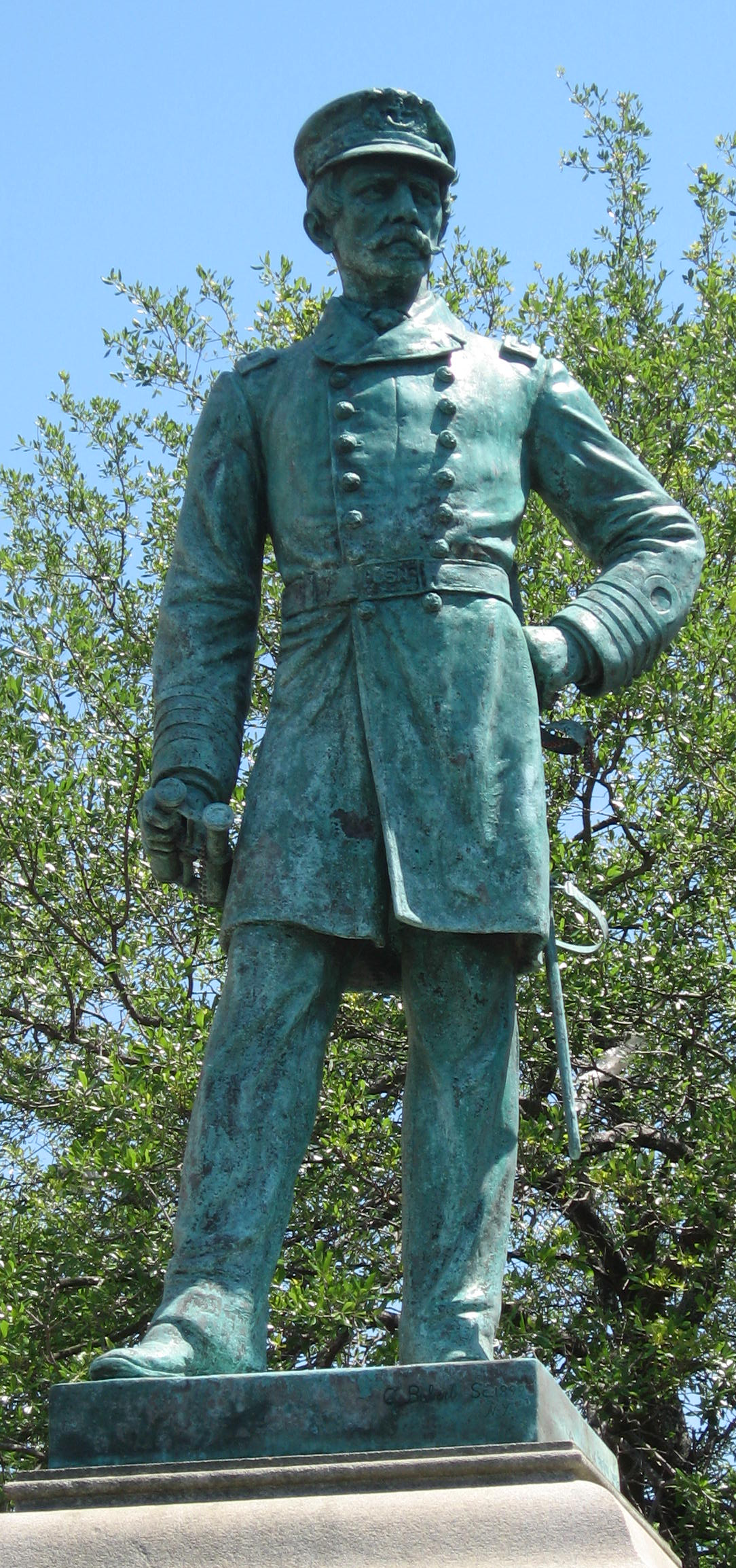
Example of a Confederate naval officer's uniform (statue of Captain Raphael Semmes, Mobile, Alabama)

According to the dress code of the Confederate Navy, shoulder straps were to be worn differently by each rank.

- Admirals wore a shoulder strap of sky-blue cloth, edged with black, that was four inches long and one inch and three-eighths wide embroidered with gold one-quarter of an inch in width. They had five stars spaced equally, the two on the ends six-tenths of an inch in diameter, and the three intermediate stars six-eighths of an inch in diameter.
- Flag officers wore a shoulder strap of sky-blue cloth, edged with black, that was four inches long and one inch and three-eighths wide embroidered with gold one-quarter of an inch in width. They had four stars spaced equally, the two on the ends six-tenths of an inch in diameter, and the two intermediate stars six-eighths of an inch in diameter.
- Captains wore the same shoulder straps as the flag officers, but with three equally spaced stars, each six-tenths of an inch in diameter.
- Commanders also had the same shoulder straps, but with only two stars.
- Lieutenants had the same shoulder straps, with a single, central, star.
- The shoulder straps worn by masters had the same design, but without any stars.
- Passed midshipmen wore a strip of gold lace four inches in length and a half an inch wide.
- For a midshipman, no shoulder straps were to be worn.

=== Caps ===
Confederate naval caps were made of steel gray cloth. They were not to be less than three inches and a half, nor more than four inches in height. They were also not to be more than ten, or less than nine inches and a half, at the top, and had a patent leather visor, to be worn by all officers in their service dress.

- For a flag officer, the cap had an anchor in an open wreath of oak leaves, with four stars above the anchor. They were to be embroidered in gold as per pattern.
- For a captain, the same as a flag officer's, except that there were only three stars above the anchor, and the gold band was one and one-half inches wide.
- For a commander it was to be the same as for a captain, except that there were only but two stars.
- For a lieutenant, the same as that of a captain, except there was only one star.
- For a master, the same as for a captain, except that there was no star.
- For a passed midshipman, an anchor without a wreath.
- For a midshipman, no caps were to be worn.

== Confederate States Marine Corps ==
The uniform used by the Confederate States Marine Corps resembled that prescribed for the Confederate Army. However, there is controversy about some of the exact details of the uniform, since the CSMC was not as large, and many of its records were destroyed. In 1865, right after the war's end, Lloyd J. Beall, commander of the CSMC, had a fire at his home which destroyed most of the CSMC's records. It is clear, however, that the Marines were often equipped out of the stores of whichever garrison was nearest their location. One description has the Marines dressed in frock coats of a particular (and undetermined) shade of gray, and dark blue or black trousers. It appears that Confederate marines wore forage caps although it is unclear if there was any ornamentation on the cover. Much of the gear worn by the CSMC was imported from Russia, and from Great Britain and its empire, mainly Canada. This created a fairly unusual look.

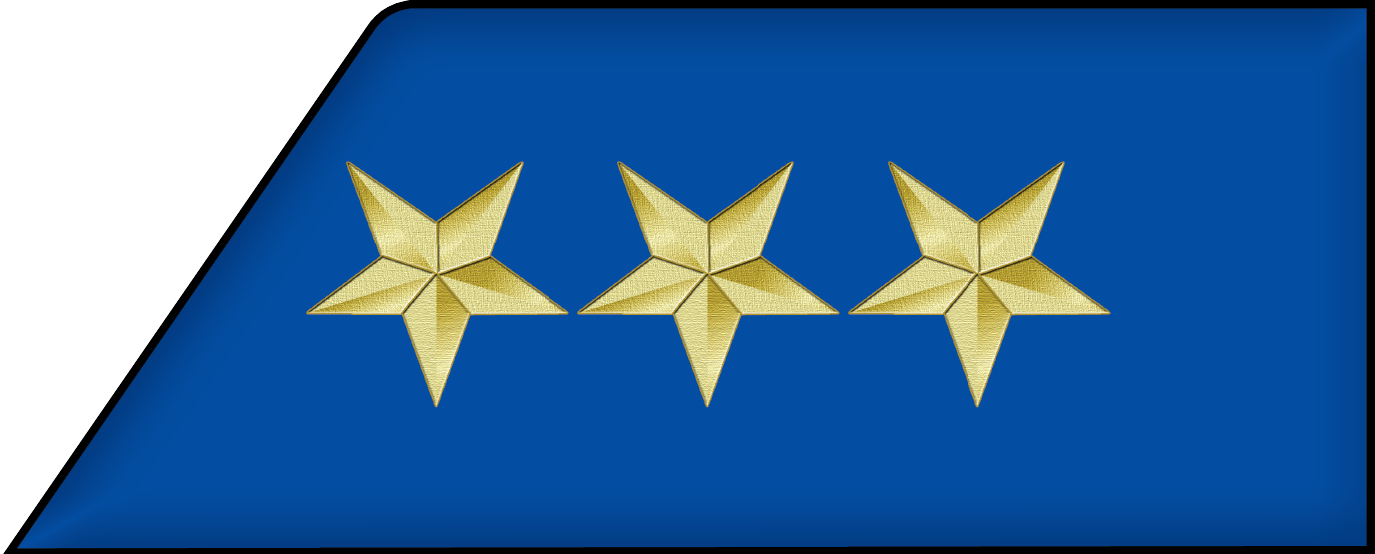
Colonel

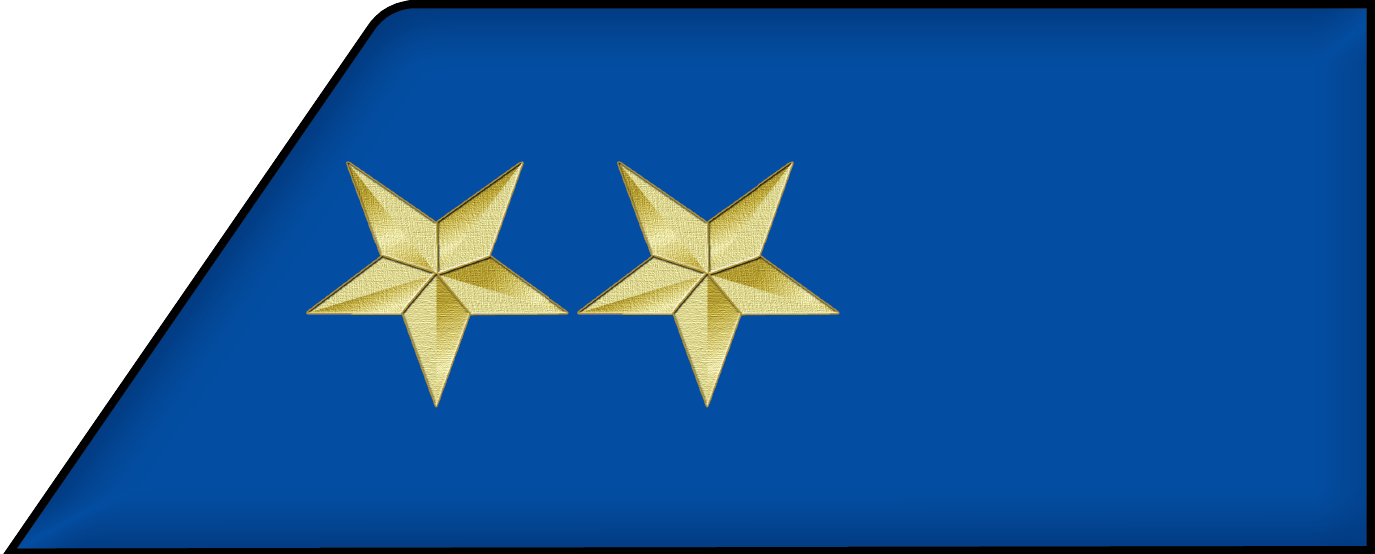
Lieutenant colonel

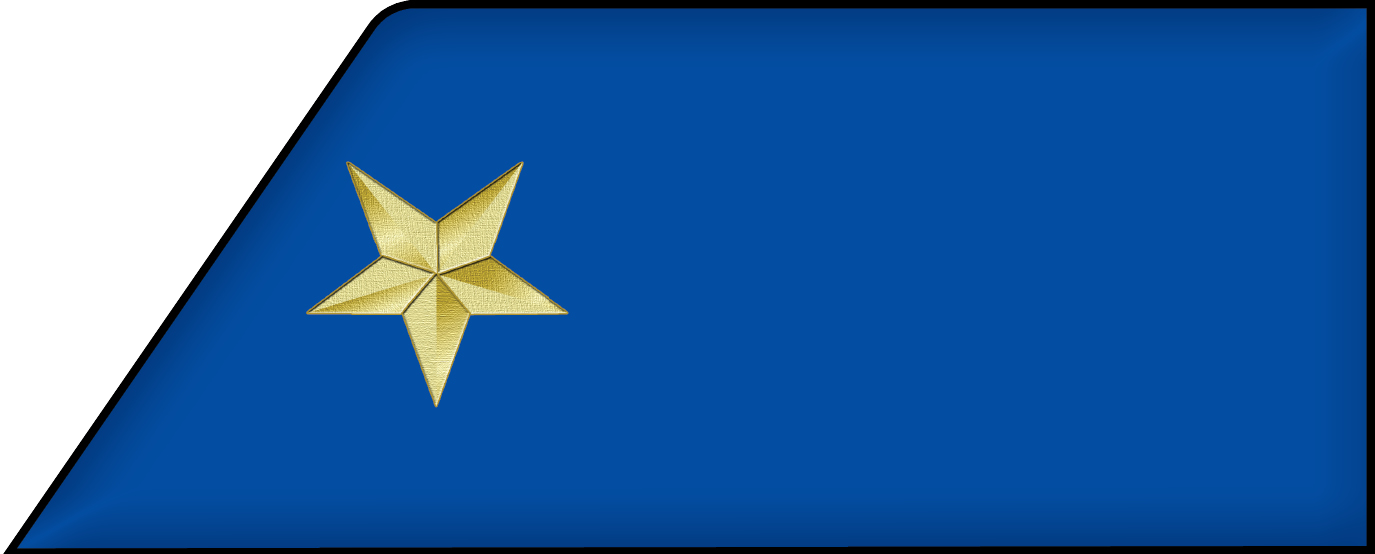
Major

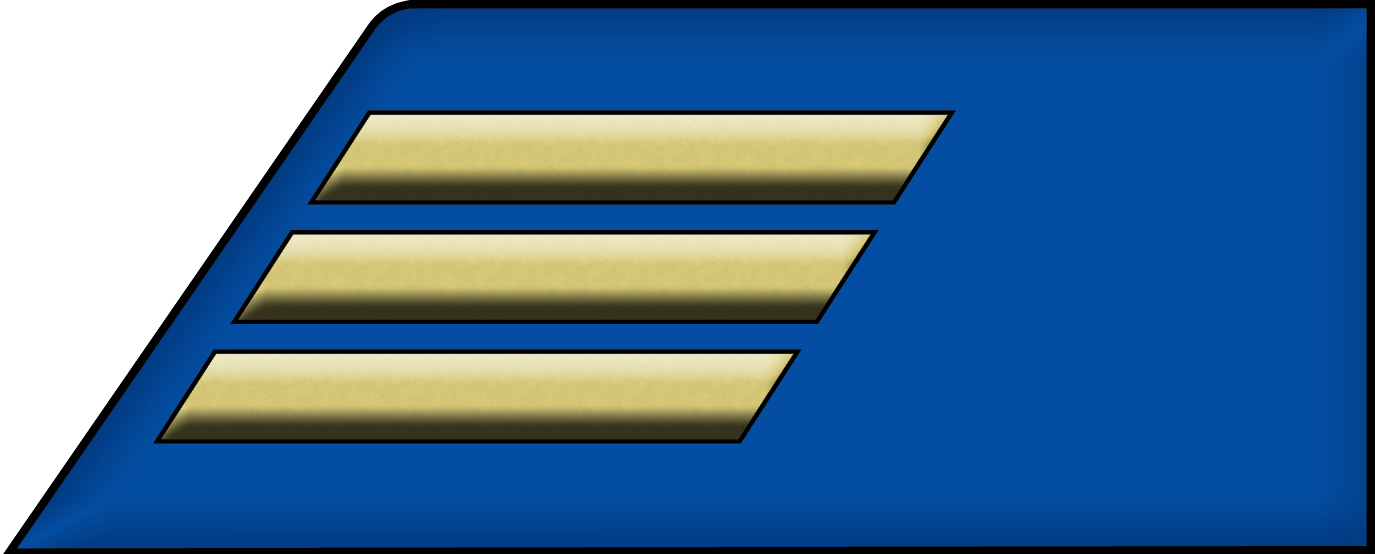
Captain

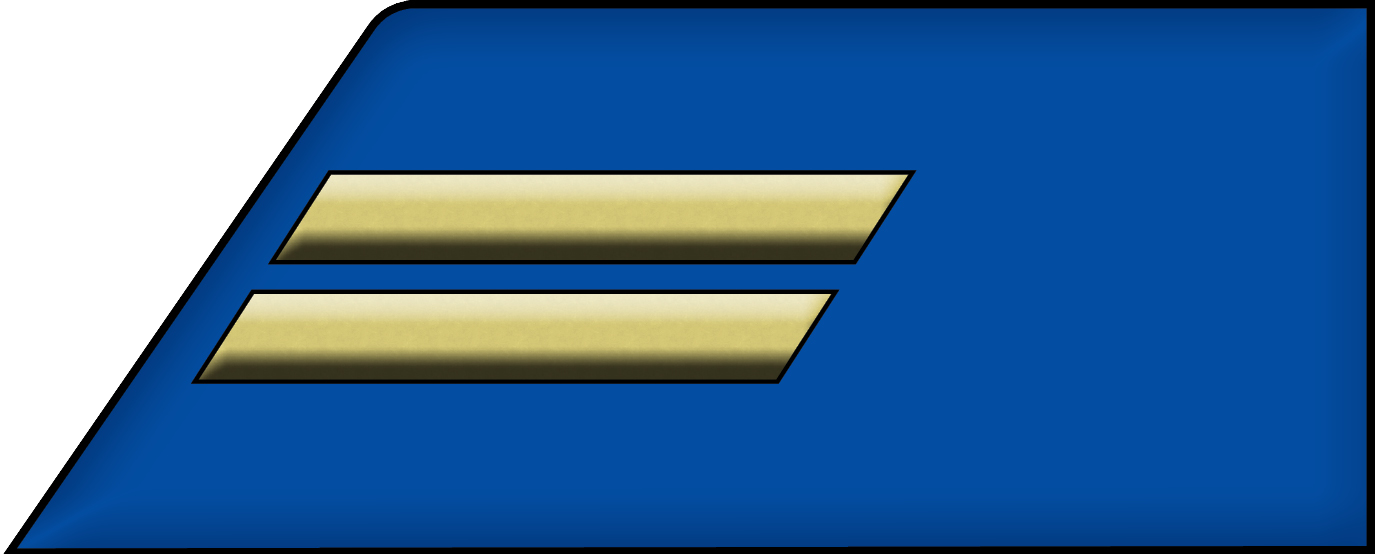
First lieutenant

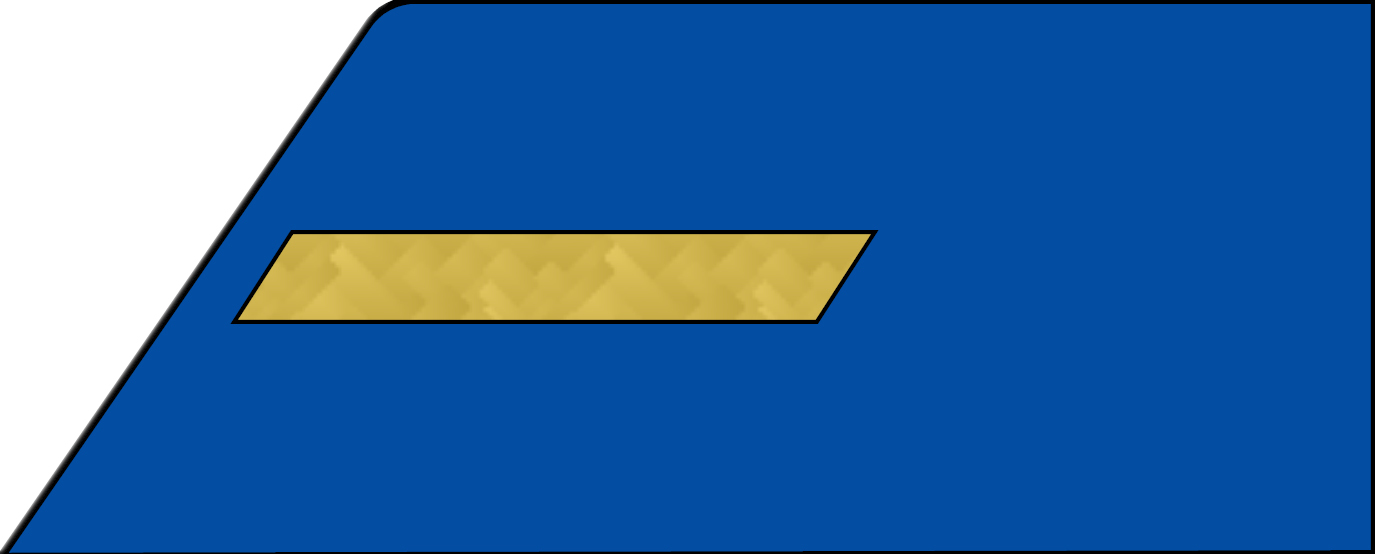
Second lieutenant

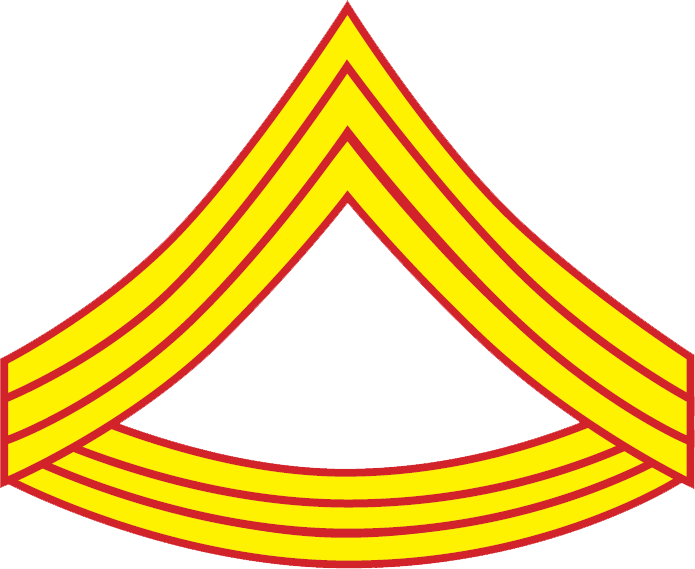
Sergeant major

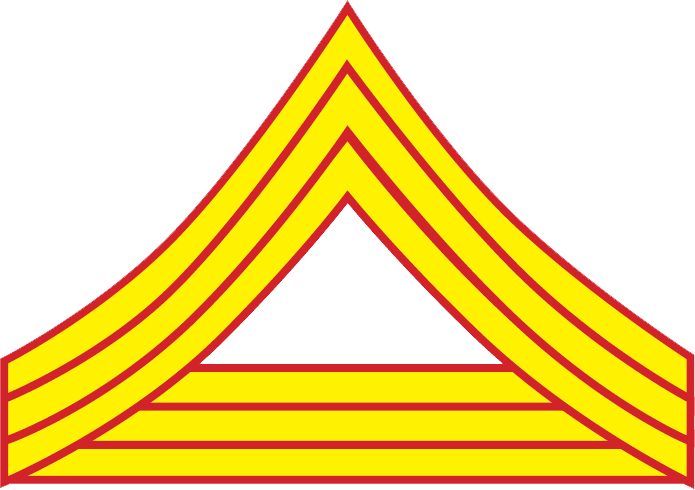
Quartermaster sergeant

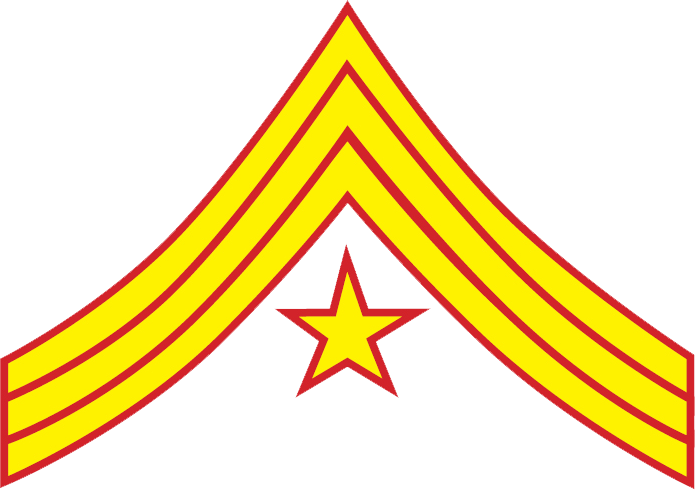
Ordnance sergeant

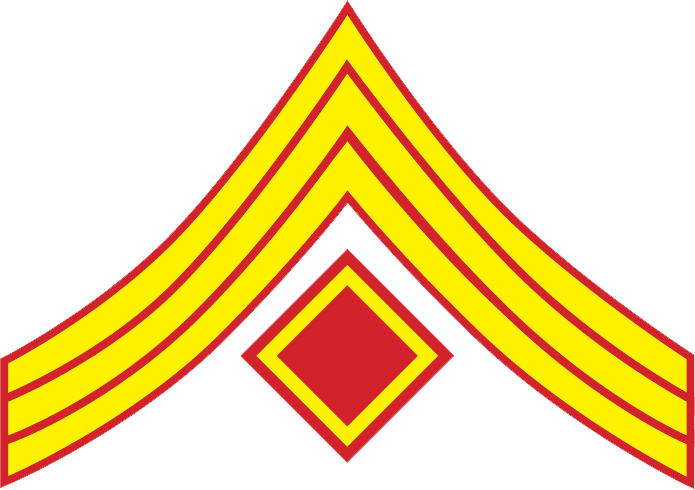
First sergeant

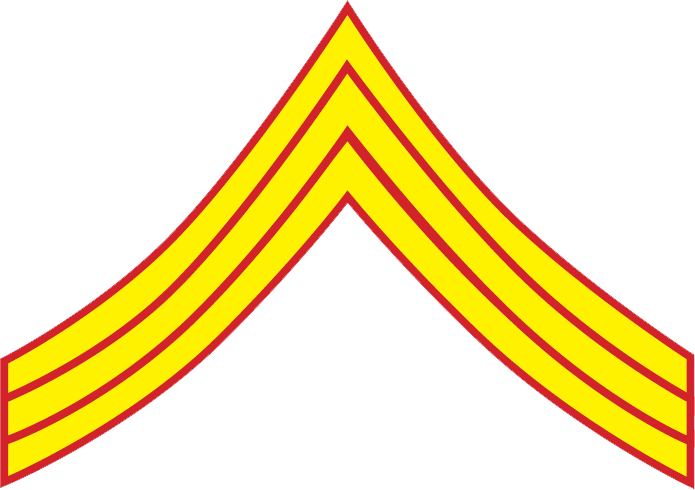
Sergeant

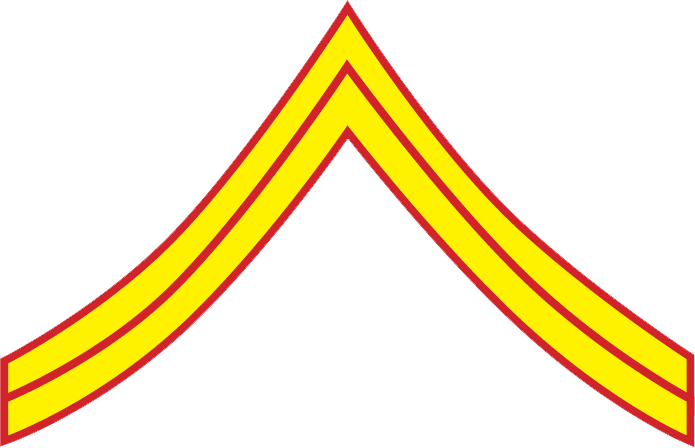
Corporal

== See also ==
- Military of the Confederate States of America
- Military ranks of the Confederate States
- Uniform of the Union Army
