= Cadet grey =

Shade of grey

Color coordinates
- Hex triplet: #91A3B0
- sRGB^{B} (r, g, b): (145, 163, 176)
- HSV (h, s, v): (205°, 18%, 69%)
- CIELCh_{uv} (L, C, h): (66, 16, 231°)
- Source: ISCC-NBS
- ISCC–NBS descriptor: Grayish blue
- B: Normalized to [0–255] (byte)

Cadet grey (also spelled gray in American English) is a somewhat blue-greyish shade of the colour grey. The first recorded use of cadet grey as a colour name in English was in 1912. Before 1912, the phrase cadet grey was used as a name for a type of military issue uniform.

== Variations ==
=== Space cadet ===
Space cadet

Color coordinates
- Hex triplet: #1E2952
- sRGB^{B} (r, g, b): (30, 41, 82)
- HSV (h, s, v): (227°, 63%, 32%)
- CIELCh_{uv} (L, C, h): (18, 29, 260°)
- Source: Resene
- ISCC–NBS descriptor: Dark blue
- B: Normalized to [0–255] (byte)

Space cadet is one of the colours on the Resene Colour List, a colour list popular in Australia and New Zealand. The colour "space cadet" was formulated in 2007.

=== Cadet blue ===
Cadet blue

Color coordinates
- Hex triplet: #5F9EA0
- sRGB^{B} (r, g, b): (95, 158, 160)
- HSV (h, s, v): (182°, 41%, 63%)
- CIELCh_{uv} (L, C, h): (61, 30, 195°)
- Source: X11
- ISCC–NBS descriptor: Light bluish green
- B: Normalized to [0–255] (byte)

The first recorded use of cadet blue as a colour name in English was in 1892.

In 1987, cadet blue was formulated as one of the X11 colours, which in the early 1990s became known as the X11 web colours.

=== Cadet ===
Cadet

Color coordinates
- Hex triplet: #536872
- sRGB^{B} (r, g, b): (83, 104, 114)
- HSV (h, s, v): (199°, 27%, 45%)
- CIELCh_{uv} (L, C, h): (43, 15, 224°)
- ISCC–NBS descriptor: Grayish blue
- B: Normalized to [0–255] (byte)

The first recorded use of cadet as a colour name in English was in 1915.

== Military use ==
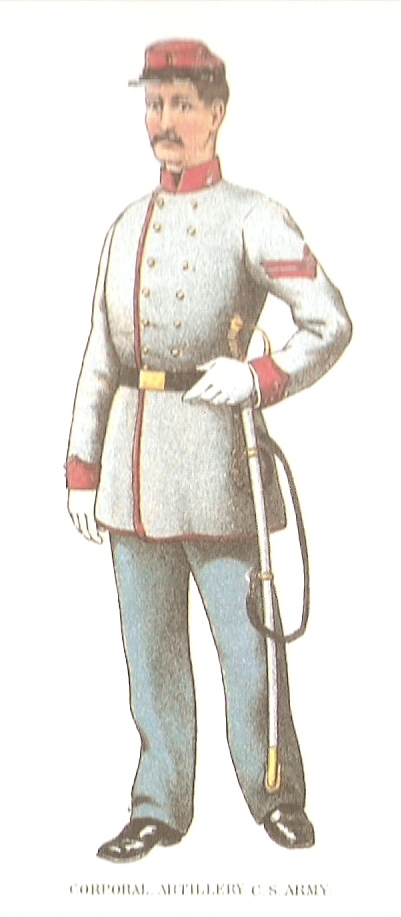
Uniform of a Confederate artillery corporal

The name cadet grey stems from its use in uniforms of the United States Army, in particular, cadets at the United States Military Academy at West Point, New York.

Both armies in the American Civil War initially included uniforms in the colour, including the 7th New York Militia, but it was primarily identified with those of the Confederate States of America. By 1863, all troops were asked to obey the Regulations for the Confederate States Army and have cadet grey uniforms. The lack of a formal uniform at the beginning of the war, with some Confederates wearing blue and some Union state militias still wearing grey, caused significant confusion for both sides in the First Battle of Bull Run.

Cadet grey was previously chosen for the Army of the Republic of Texas in 1835 and 1840.

Under the name "pike grey" (Hechtgrau) this colour distinguished the jäger regiments of the Austrian (and subsequently Austro-Hungarian) armies from the 18th century until 1915. In 1908 it was adopted as the universal colour of the new field service uniform for the army as a whole.

== See also ==
- Uniforms of the Confederate States military forces
- List of colours
