= Cloak =

Long, loose overgarment fastening at the neck

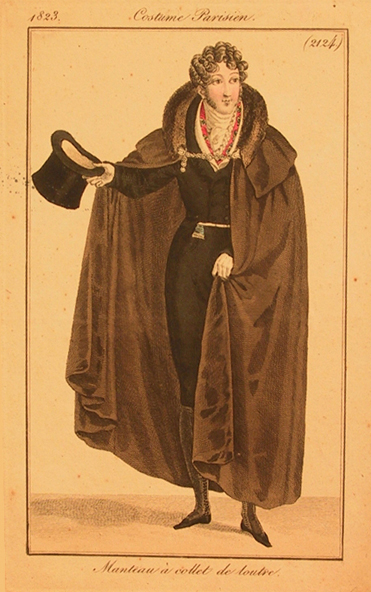
A young man in an evening cloak, 1823

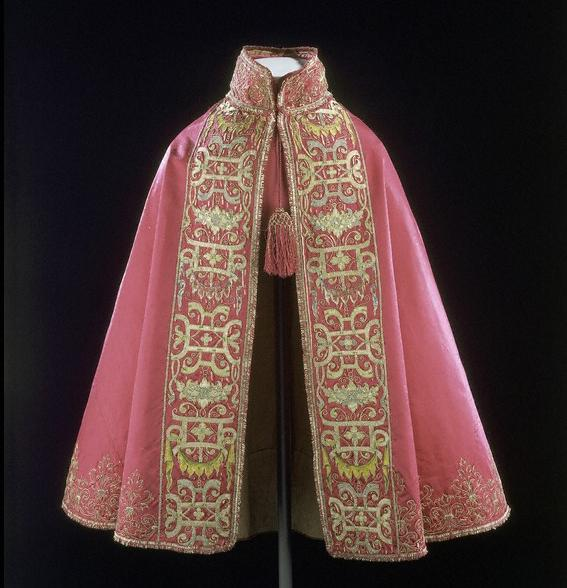
Cloak, 1580–1600 Victoria and Albert Museum, No. 793-1901

A cloak is a type of loose garment worn over clothing, mostly but not always, as outerwear for outdoor wear, which serves the same purpose as an overcoat and protects the wearer from the weather. It may form part of a uniform. People in many different societies may wear cloaks. Over time, cloak designs have changed to match fashion and available textiles.

Cloaks generally fasten at the neck or over the shoulder, and vary in length from the hip to the ankle, with mid-calf being the normal length. They may have an attached hood and may cover and fasten down the front, in which case they have holes or slits for the hands to pass through. However, cloaks are almost always sleeveless.

Christian clerics may wear a cappa or a cope – forms of cloak – as liturgical vestments or as part of a religious habit.

== Etymology ==
The word cloak comes from Old North French cloque (Old French cloche, cloke) meaning "bell", from Medieval Latin clocca "travelers' cape," literally "a bell," so called from the garment's bell-like shape. Thus the word is related to the word clock.

== History ==
Ancient Greeks and Romans were known to wear cloaks. Greek men and women wore the himation, from the Archaic through the Hellenistic periods (c. 750–30 BC). Romans would later wear the Greek-styled cloak, the pallium. The pallium was quadrangular, shaped like a square, and sat on the shoulders, not unlike the himation.

Romans of the Republic would wear the toga as a formal display of their citizenship. It was denied to foreigners and was worn by magistrates on all occasions as a badge of office. The toga allegedly originated with Numa Pompilius (r. 715–672 BC), the second semi-legendary king of Rome.

Eminent personages in Kievan Rus' adopted the Byzantine chlamys in the form of a fur-lined korzno (Old East Slavic: кързно).

Powerful noblemen and elite warriors of the Aztec Empire would wear a tilmàtli; a Mesoamerican cloak/cape used as a symbol of their upper status. Cloth and clothing was of utmost importance for the Aztecs. The more elaborate and colorful tilmàtlis were strictly reserved for elite high priests, emperors; and the Eagle warriors as well as the Jaguar knights.

Aboriginal Australians in southeast Australia traditionally wore possum-skin cloaks, and those in western Australia wore buka cloaks, which were made from kangaroo pelts. The cloaks were also used as blankets or drums, and the leather side was etched with personal symbols.

== Opera cloak ==
In full evening dress in the Western countries, ladies and gentlemen frequently use the cloak as a fashion statement, or to protect the fine fabrics of evening wear from the elements, especially where a coat would crush or hide the garment. Opera cloaks are made of quality materials such as wool or cashmere, velvet and satin.

Ladies may wear a long (over the shoulders or to ankles) cloak usually called a cape, or a full-length cloak. Gentlemen wear an ankle-length or full-length cloak. Formal cloaks often have expensive, colored linings and trimmings such as silk, satin, velvet and fur.

The term was the title of a 1942 operatic comedy.

== In literature and the arts ==
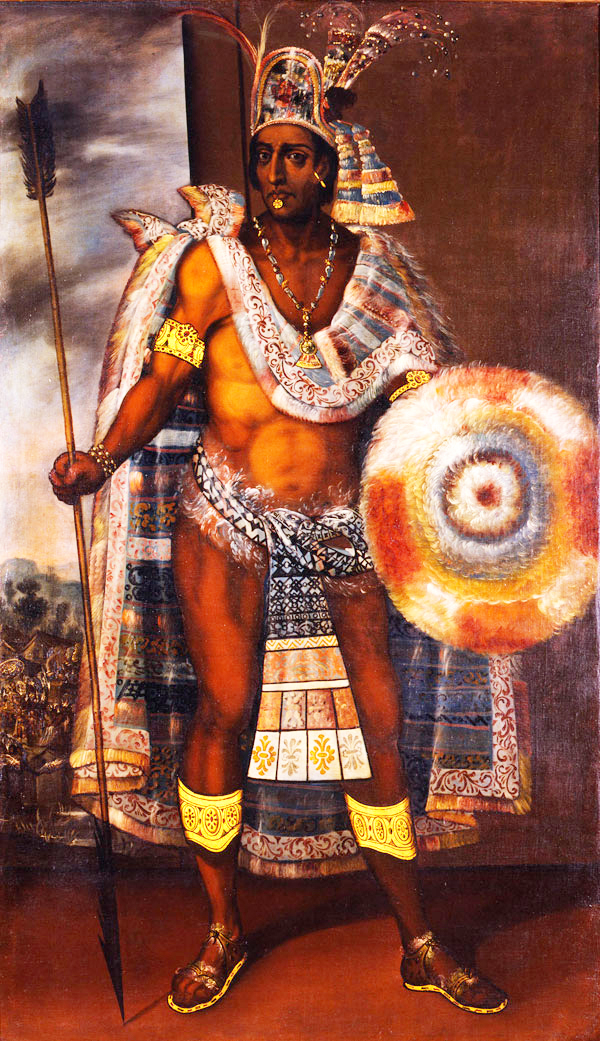
Aztec emperor Moctezuma II wearing a tilmàtli

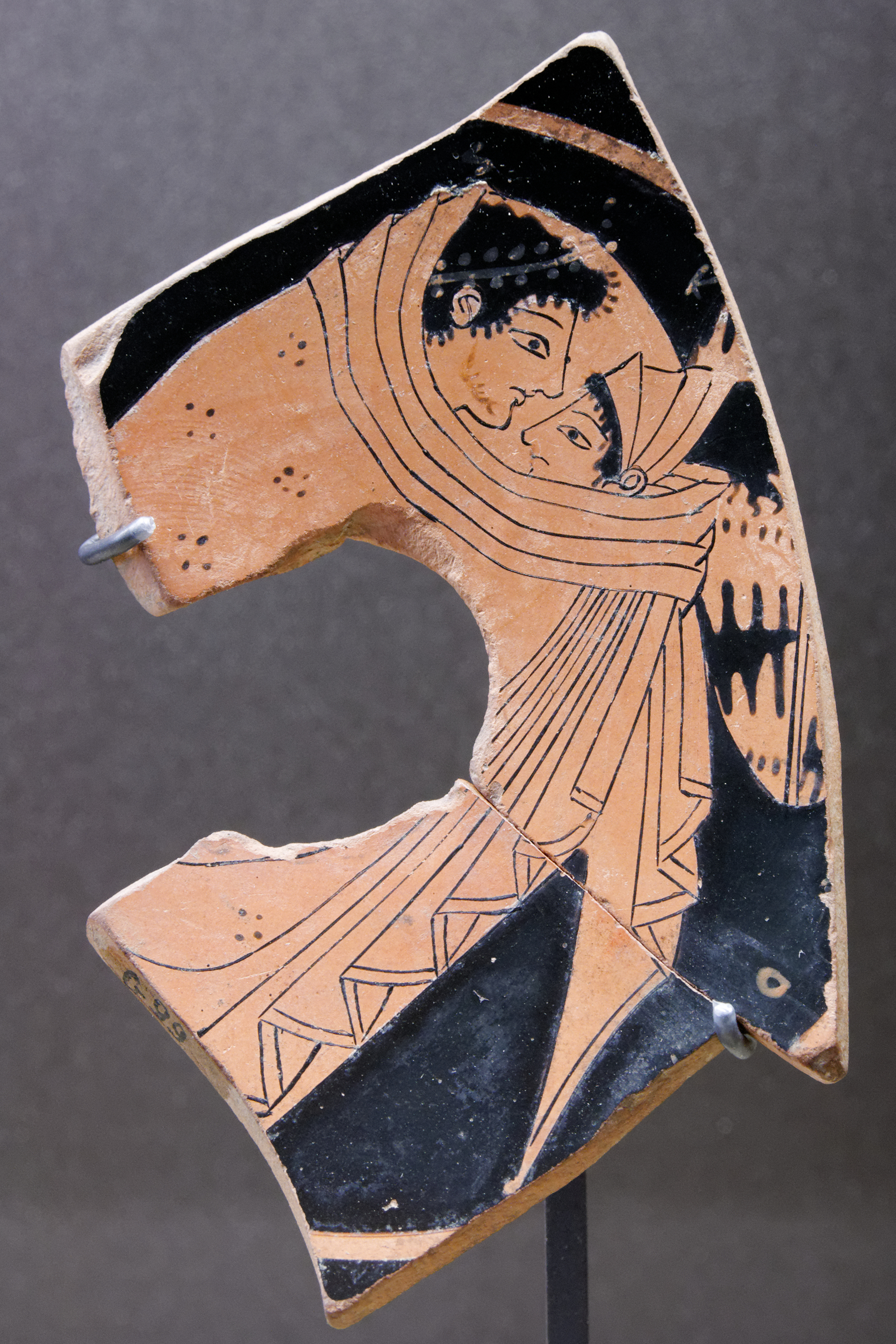
Couple hiding under the same cloak, fragment of an Ancient Greek red-figure cup, c. 525–500 BC, found in Athens. Louvre Museum, Paris.

According to the King James Version of the Bible, Matthew recorded Jesus of Nazareth saying in Matthew 5:40: "And if any man will sue thee at the law, and take away thy coat, let him have thy cloke also." The King James Version of the Bible has the words recorded a little differently in Luke 6:29: "...and him that taketh away thy cloke, forbid not to take thy coat also."

Cloaks are a staple garment in the fantasy genre due to the popularity of medieval settings. They are also usually associated with witches, wizards, and vampires; the best-known stage version of Dracula, which first made actor Bela Lugosi prominent, featured him wearing it so that his exit through a trap door concealed on the stage could seem sudden. When Lugosi reprised his role as Dracula for the 1931 Universal Studios motion picture version of the play, he retained the cloak as part of his outfit, which made such a strong impression that cloaks came to be equated with Count Dracula in nearly all non-historical media depictions of him.

Fantasy cloaks are often magical. For example, they may grant the person wearing it invisibility as in the Harry Potter series by J. K. Rowling. A similar garment appears in The Lord of the Rings by J. R. R. Tolkien, although the cloaks simply shift color help the wearer to blend in with their surroundings. The Marvel character Doctor Strange wears a Cloak of Levitation that has other mystical abilities. Cloaks in fantasy may nullify magical projectiles, as the "cloak of magic resistance" in NetHack.

== Metaphor ==
Figuratively, a cloak may be anything that disguises or conceals something. In many science fiction franchises, such as Star Trek, there are cloaking devices, which provide a way to avoid detection by making objects appear invisible. A real device, albeit of limited capability, was demonstrated in 2006.

Because they keep a person hidden and conceal a weapon, the phrase cloak and dagger has come to refer to espionage and secretive crimes: it suggests murder from hidden sources. "Cloak and dagger" stories are thus mystery, detective, and crime stories of this. The vigilante duo of Marvel comics Cloak and Dagger is a reference to this.

== See also ==
- Kinsale cloak
- Mantle (clothing)
- Poncho
- Robe
- Serape
- Shawl
- Shroud
- Stole (shawl)
- Spanish cloak
- Veil
- Witzchoura
- Wrap (clothing)

== Sources ==
- Oxford English Dictionary
- Ashelford, Jane: The Art of Dress: Clothing and Society 1500–1914, Abrams, 1996. ISBN 0-8109-6317-5
- Baumgarten, Linda: What Clothes Reveal: The Language of Clothing in Colonial and Federal America, Yale University Press, 2016. ISBN 0-300-09580-5
- Payne, Blanche: History of Costume from the Stone Age to the Twentysecond Century, Harper & Row, 2965. No ISBN for this edition; ASIN B0006BMNFS
- Picken, Mary Brooks: The Fashion Dictionary, Funk and Bagnalls, 1957. (1973 edition ISBN 0-308-10052-2)
