= Kinsale cloak =

Cloak style

The Kinsale cloak (Irish: fallaing Chionn tSáile), worn until the twentieth century in Kinsale and West Cork, was the last remaining cloak style in Ireland. It was a woman's wool outer garment which evolved from the Irish cloak, a garment worn by both men and women for many centuries.

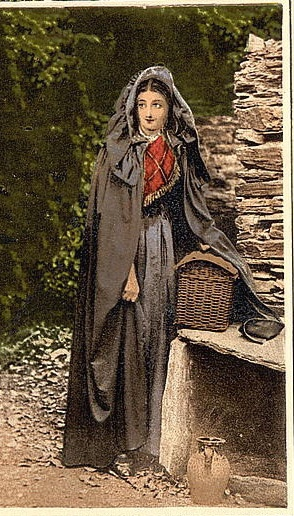
Image from an old postcard showing a woman wearing a Kinsale Cloak

== Historical development ==
The Kinsale Cloak, also known as the West Cork Cloak or Irish Cloak, evolved from cloaks which were worn throughout Europe since at least the Bronze Age. Worn since prehistoric times in Ireland, by the early historic period, the outer wrap garment had become a four-cornered "brat" of almost rectangular shape. In a 1904 discovery in Armoy, County Antirm, Ireland, late Bronze Age tools were found wrapped in a woolen brat sewn from two pieces of wool, giving evidence that cloaks were worn in Ireland as far back as 750 BC.

Likely by 600 AD, the brat had evolved into a cape-like shape of the type worn in the drawing of St. Matthew in the Book of Durrow (dated to shortly after 600 AD), which was fitted at the shoulders and reached to below the knees.

In the 16th century, when cloaks became common items of dress in Europe, woolen weather-proof cloaks evolved in Ireland. However, English laws passed during the reign of Henry VIII tried to get rid of the cloak as an item of dress in Ireland. During the Elizabethan Wars, the cloak was especially frowned-upon because it was associated with rebellion: it was both warm and waterproof, and it enabled Irish fighting men to remain out in the hills in the worst of weather. "A fit house for an outlaw, a meet bed for a rebel, and an apt cloak for a thief", wrote Edmund Spenser, an English poet who lived in the Elizabethan era, describing the Irish cloak at the end of the 16th century.

Irish women of the seventeenth and eighteenth centuries adopted the hooded cloak as a general-purpose outdoor garment. These cloaks varied in colour throughout Ireland, being red in Cork and blue in Waterford, but the material was always a quality melton, which has a wool pile.

== 19th century ==
In 1842, Mr. and Mrs. S.C. Hall praised the Irish cloak commenting on its "graceful drapery". They said that "the material falls well and folds well. It is usually large enough to envelope the whole person; and the hood is frequently drawn forward to shield the face of the wearer from sun, rain or wind."

In the early 19th century, red was a popular color used for cloaks, but it began to fall out of favor. According to Dunlevy, "An aversion to the colour red in these cloaks developed in some places: an aversion explained by Thomas Crofton Croker as due to the consternation caused through confusion with the red coats of the English soldiers at the time of the 1798 rebellion. While his anecdote may contain some truth, an equally likely reason was the cost of red dye, for grey or “undyed” cloaks were used by the less wealthy in areas where red was popular. The Dublin Society surveys record that in the first decades of the 19th century the fashion for red cloaks survived strongly in Sligo, Leitrim, Longford, Cork, Meath and in Connacht, but that different shades of blue, as well as grey and black, were used throughout the country."

By the end of the 19th century, and following the social upheaval of the Famine of 1847, the traditional hooded cloak had nearly disappeared from much of Ireland, but remained popular in the western part of the country, thus giving the name "Kinsale cloak" or "West Cork cloak" to the garment.

== 20th century ==
By the 20th century, West Cork alone upheld the tradition of the Irish cloak, and with rare exception black was the common colour. They were often a mother's present to her daughter on getting married and handed down from one generation to the next.

Throughout West Cork, the overall design of the cloak did not vary, but details such as the ornamental beaded braidwork did - and so towns like Macroom, Bandon, Clonakilty, Skibbereen and Bantry claimed to have had local garments. Because the variations were small, it would be more accurate to speak of the West Cork Cloak as a general term rather than mentioning the individual towns, with the exception of Kinsale. The hood of the West Cork Cloak was never to be thrown back entirely, however the Kinsale Cloak had a hood that could be worn either erect or thrown back.

The cloak was entirely hand made, and sewn with a long needle. Four yards of heavy black cloth (melton) went into the making and the trimmings included satin for lining, jet and beaded braid. Fastened by a single hook and eye near the neck, the folds of the garment were relieved by a pair of mock pockets faced with jet, which covered the hand slits.

The upper part of hood proper was, if possible, fuller than the cloak, being gathered and rucked behind the neck. The inside of the hood was satin lined and the top of the hood was finished with a satin bow. Within the hood sat the flat jet collar ornamented with a pattern of beaded braid and tied with a satin bow over the single functional fastening of the cloak.

Two of the best known Kinsale Cloak makers were Ellen Kirby (née Richardson) and her daughter Mary. Ellen Kirby was born in Ballinspittle near Kinsale in 1834, and learned the art of cloak making from her mother. Mrs. Kirby's workroom was at Fisher Street in Kinsale, but she also covered parts of West Cork travelling regularly by train to Bandon and Clonakilty to take orders and measurements. The cost of materials for a Kinsale Hood Cloak prior to 1920 was about 14 to 20 pounds, and Mrs. Kirby's charge for making the cloak was five shillings. After her death in 1920, her daughter Mary, a dressmaker, took up the business and dedicated herself to its traditional skills until her own death in 1940 at the age of eighty-two.

== Today ==
A Kinsale cloak is on display in "The Way We Wore" exhibit among the National Museum of Ireland – Decorative Arts and History collections in Dublin. Although the Kinsale Cloak is no longer seen on the streets of Ireland, it has occasionally inspired fashion designers to create evening cloaks with a similar design. The Kinsale-style cloak is most often worn today at historical reenactments and Renaissance fairs internationally, in part due to a popular sewing pattern available to the home seamstress.

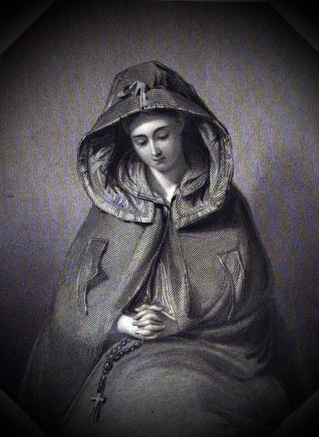
"The Irish Hood" by Daniel Maclise (1837) showing a woman wearing a Kinsale Cloak

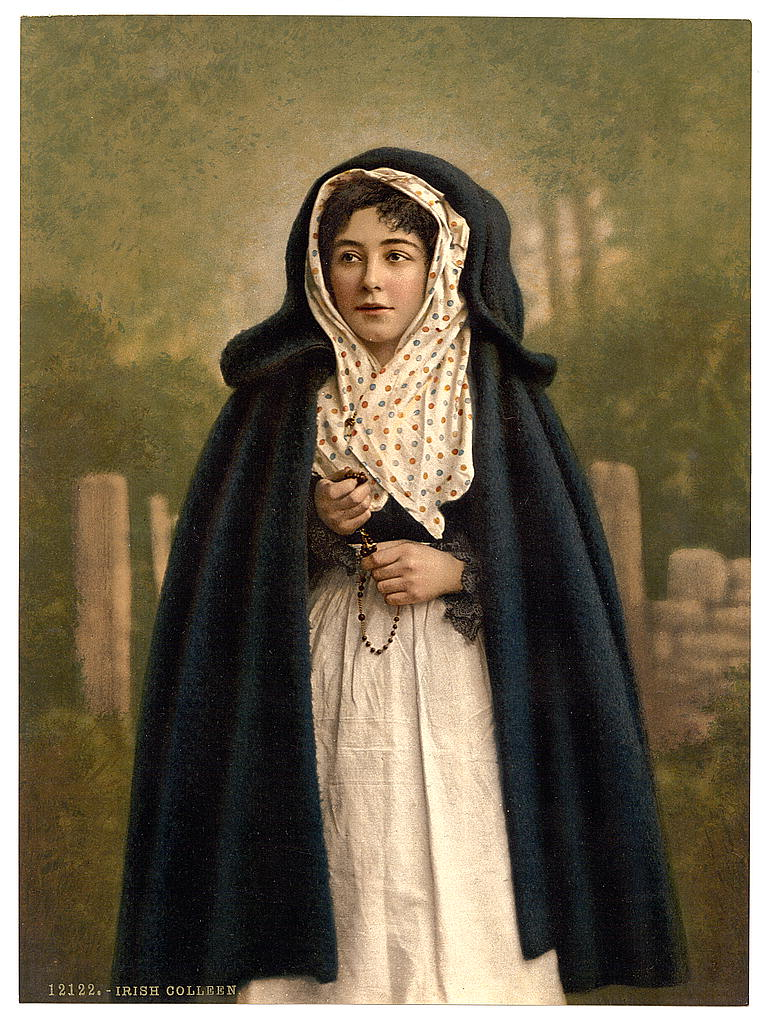
An 'Irish Colleen' wearing a cloak and holding rosary beads

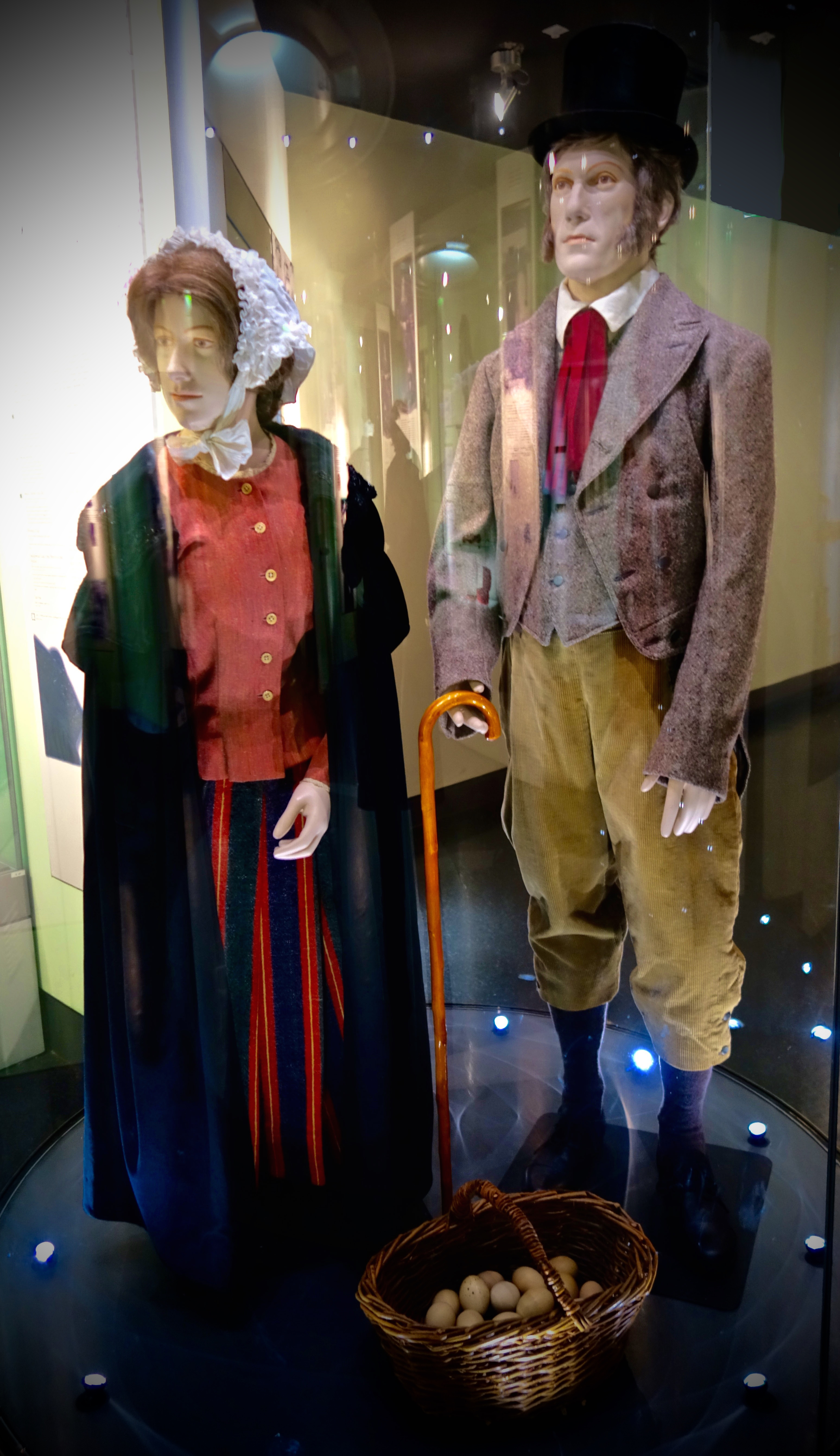
19th century clothing of people of the west of Ireland. The Kinsale Cloak was worn about a finger length shorter than the skirt

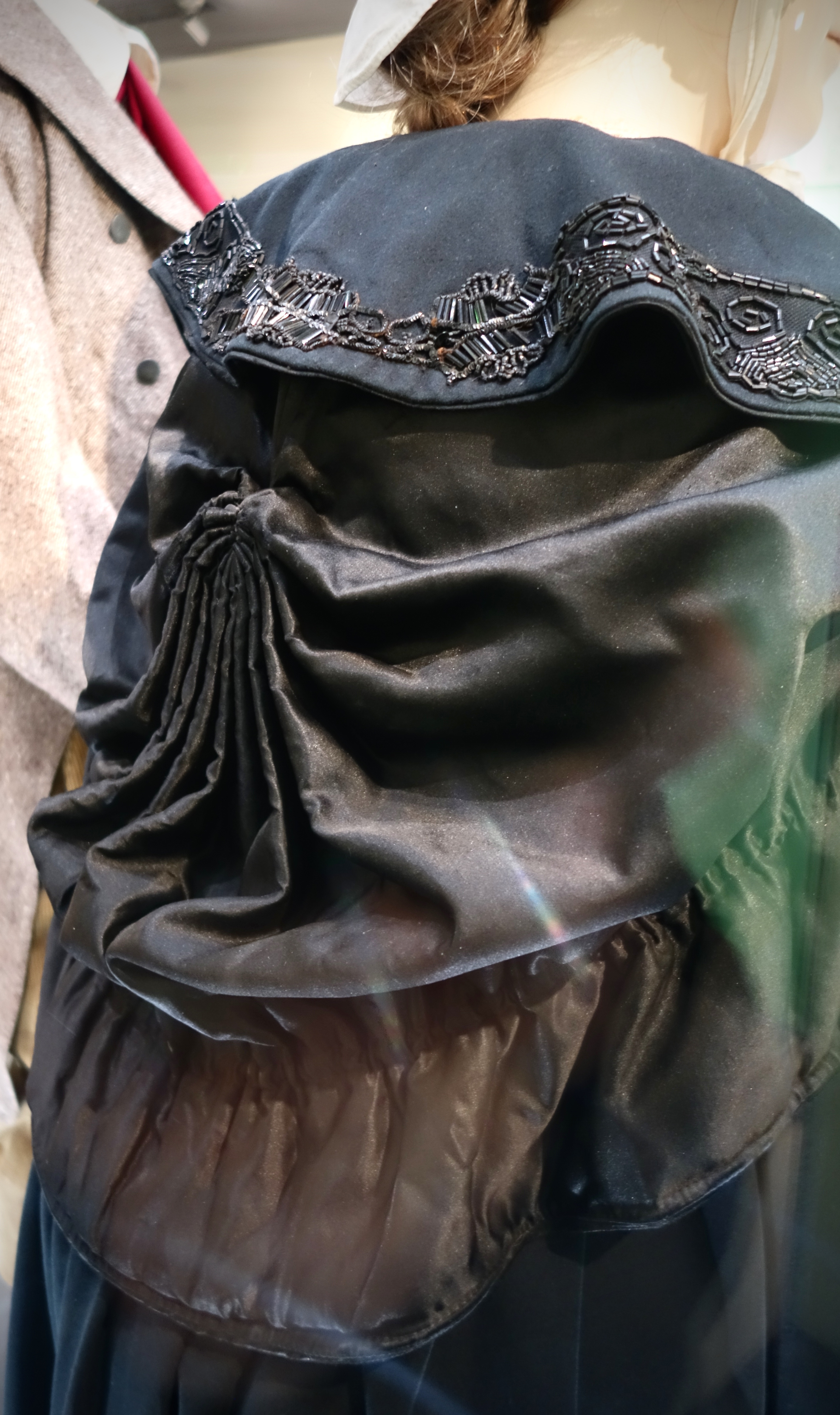
The back of a Kinsale Cloak, made by Mrs. Kirby, showing the satin lining of the hood and the beadwork on the collar

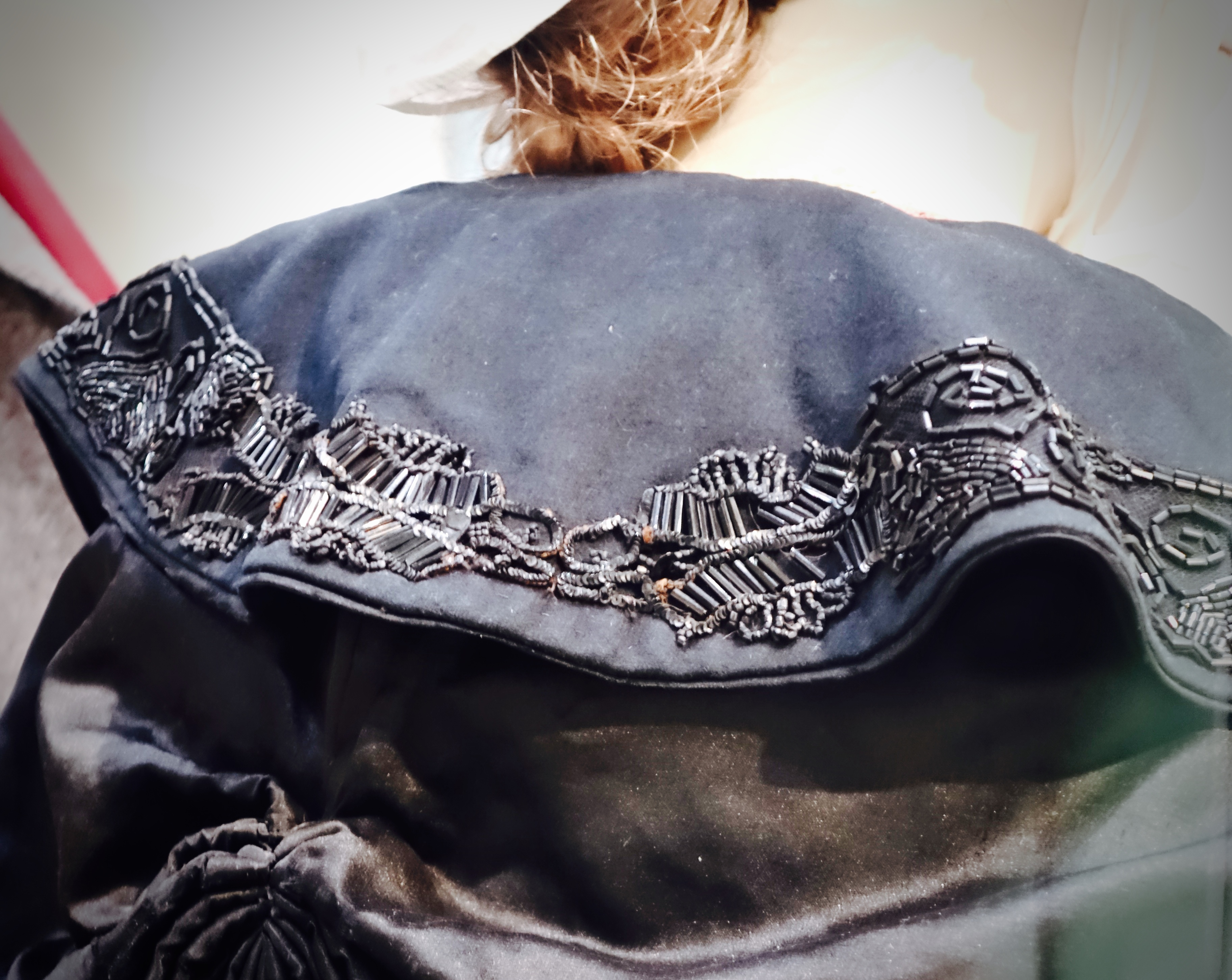
Glass beading on the back collar of this Kinsale Cloak suggests it was a cloak for special occasions
