= Uniforms of the Union army =

Military uniforms of the Union Army in the American Civil War

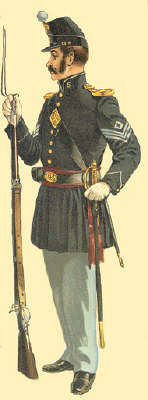
A plate showing the uniform of a U.S. Army first sergeant, circa 1858, influenced by the French army

The military uniforms of the Union Army in the American Civil War were widely varied and, due to limitations on supply of wool and other materials, based on availability and cost of materials. The ideal uniform was prescribed as a dark blue coat with lighter pants, with a black hat. Officer's ranks were denoted with increasing levels of golden decoration. Specific jobs, companies, and units had markedly different styles at times, often following European customs such as that of the Zouaves. Officers' uniforms tended to be highly customized and would stray from Army standard. Ironically, several main pieces of gear had been created by order of the United States Secretary of War Jefferson Davis before the war; he later became Confederate President.

== Generalization ==
The standard U.S. Army uniform at the outbreak of the war had acquired its definitive form in the 1858 regulations. It consisted of a campaign uniform, a parade (dress) uniform, and a fatigue uniform.

During the war, enforcement of uniform regulations was imperfect. Uniforms were adapted to local conditions, the commander's preference, and what was available. For example, shoulder straps began replacing epaulettes in dress occasions. As a result, almost any variation of the official uniform could be found as officers and men abandoned some items, adopted others and modified still others.

Described in general terms this uniform consisted of:

=== Service and campaign ===
The service and campaign uniform consisted of the following:

- Headgear: A black felt Hardee hat, the Model 1858 dress hat, with one brim being secured by means of an embroidered eagle for officers and a metallic eagle for enlisted men, after the U.S. coat of arms of the day. Forage caps were regulation for service and non-dress occasions, while the non-regulation kepi was also widely used.
- Coat: In Prussian blue, tight fitting and almost knee length, trimmed in the arm of service piping along the collar edges; and in the French-peak styled cuff trim, for all enlisted ranks. Company officers wore an untrimmed single-breasted coat, with shoulder straps to signify rank and branch of service. Cavalry and horse artillery used a short jacket, which was more practical for riding. Field and general officers wore a double-breasted version, with generals wearing dark blue velvet collars and cuffs. A sack coat was also issued as a fatigue uniform, being lined for recruits, and unlined for a service uniform. Rank insignia was worn on the coat, the same as the dress frock.
- Greatcoat: In sky blue, with standing collar and French cuffs and a fixed short cape. Officers could wear this or a dark blue variant.
- Trousers for all enlisted men and regimental officers were sky blue. NCOs had a vertical stripe in the arm of service colors. General officers and staff officers wore trousers of the same shade of blue as the coat. General officers and officers of the ordnance department had no stripes on their trousers, with all other officers wearing piping with their respective branch of service or gold for staff officers. The army had changed all trousers, except for light artillery, to dark blue on March 13, 1861, but this was reversed on December 21, 1861.

=== Parade order ===
The parade uniform consisted of the following:

- Headgear: The hat described with trimmings in the arm of service colors. Some units such as marines and mounted artillery retained shakos for ceremonial purposes.
- Coat: The same described (frock or short shell-jacket) with metallic epaulets resembling scales. Officers wore French-type epaulets and a sash.
- Greatcoat: As described.
- Trousers: As described.
- Short jacket: As described

=== Fatigue ===
The fatigue uniform consisted of the following:

- Headgear: A forage cap with a floppy crown. Officers tended to privately purchase more elaborate versions after the French Army model subsequently known as chasseur caps. Generals wore a variant having a black velvet band. Insignia was pinned on top of the crown or -in officers- in front of the cap.
- Coat: A cheaply made dark blue sack-coat of a simple and unsophisticated design, having a loose cut, fall collar, and no pockets.
- Greatcoat: A large sky blue overcoat double-breasted for cavalry, single-breasted for infantry. Both had capes
- Trousers: Sky blue baggy wool trousers cut with pockets. Officers had dark blue or uniforms tailored to suit individual needs.

In general terms, as the war went on, the service uniform tended to be replaced by the cheaper and more practical fatigue uniform.

== Description ==
=== Variations ===
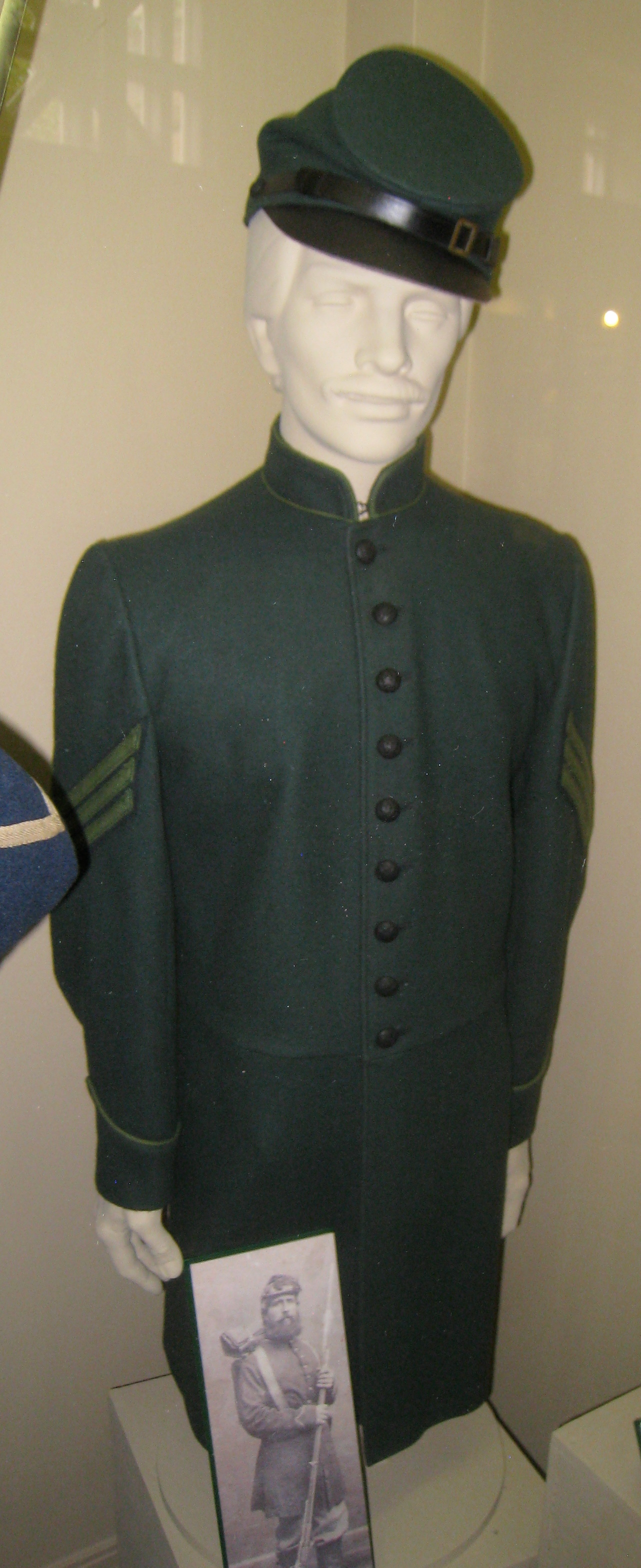
Rifle green sharpshooter's uniform, with McDowell pattern forage cap.

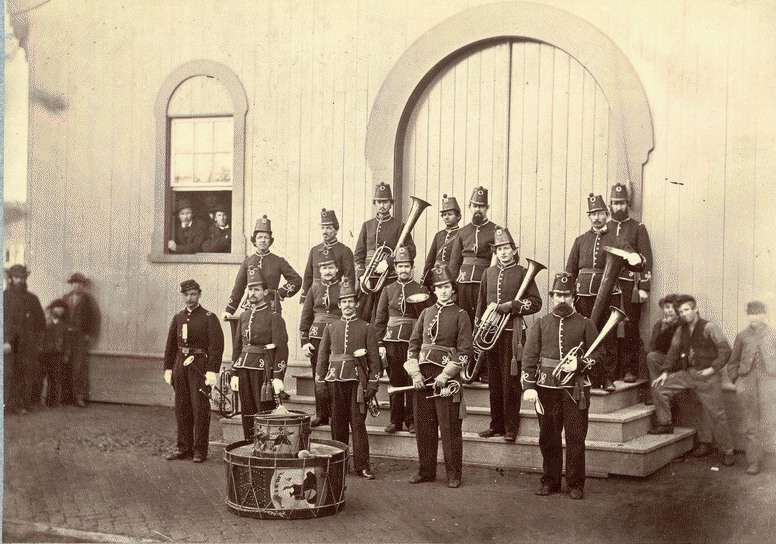
10th Veteran Reserve Corps bandsmen in sky blue jackets April 1865.

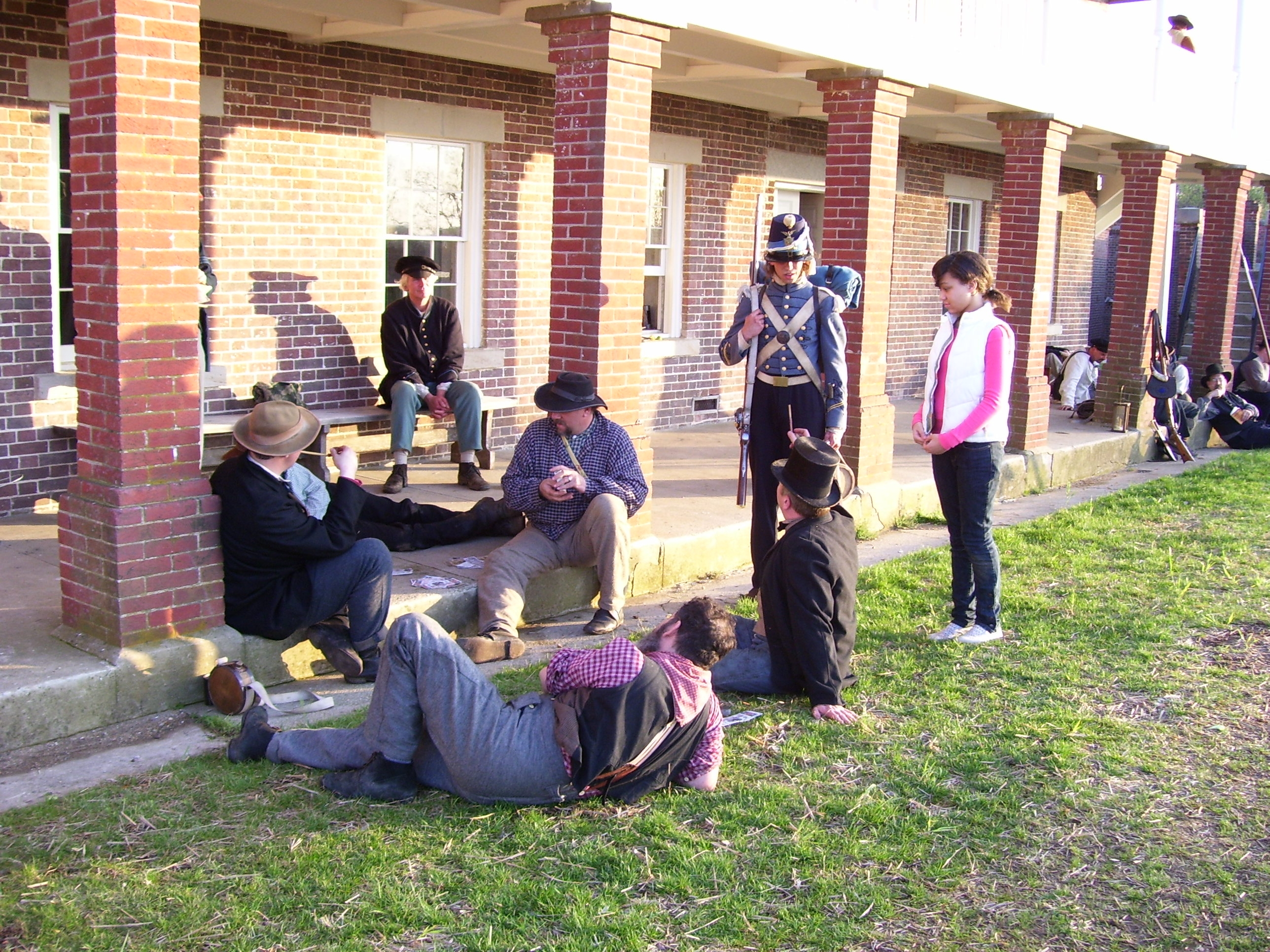
Historical re-enactor wearing the shako and gray tailcoat of a West Point cadet. The soldier in the background wears the M1839 peaked cap issued to enlisted US troops before 1858.

- A rifle green coat was issued to Berdan's Sharpshooters, 1st and 2nd Sharpshooter Regiment as an early form of camouflage. These had black rubber Goodyear buttons that would not reflect the light and give away the sniper's position.
- Marine bandsmen wore red. Infantry musicians had braid on the front of their uniforms, known as a birdcage, in the same color as the facings.
- Troops from Ohio or New York were equipped with dark blue shell jackets with shoulder straps and 9 brass buttons down the front and colored tape around edges denoting their branch of service. Depending on the unit, there are variations of this patterned jacket. The Veteran Reserve Corps were issued a similar pattern but in sky blue with navy blue tape. The number of buttons on these jackets varied between 12 and 8. Some had shoulder straps, belt loops and piping while others did not.
- One of the more unusual uniforms was worn by the 79th New York. The tunic resembled that worn by the 79th Highlanders in the British Army and was worn with a Glengarry cap, sporran and kilt for a full dress or tartan trews (later replaced with regulation light blue trousers) and a kepi when on a campaign.
- Buttons featured the US eagle which originally showed on the eagles' shields, letters denoting the soldier's branch of service: I for Infantry, C for Cavalry, D for mounted infantry or Dragoons, A for Artillery (and on some earlier uniforms then still in use: R for Rifleman, V for Voltigeur). This was done away with early in the war to cut costs; although officers continued to use such buttons well after the Spanish–American War.
- Later in the war soldiers of all branches were issued loose-fitting blue sack coats with 4 brass buttons, based on the civilian work jacket, which remained in service during the Indian Wars. However, most of the artillery and cavalry preferred to wear the color-trimmed shell jackets because of their appearance and comfort. By mid-war volunteers were issued a lined version of the sack-coat.
- Officers had to purchase their own equipment and thus tended to wear tailor-made uniforms. The frock coat had epaulettes (for dress occasions) and shoulder straps (nicknamed sardine boxes by the men), and was first issued during the Mexican War. These coats were single-breasted for lieutenants and captains and had between seven and nine buttons. It was double-breasted for senior officers and generals, with black velvet facings and buttons placed in orders of twos and threes according to rank.
- On campaign many officers, including Ulysses S. Grant, wore sack coats, either private purchase or of the type issued to enlisted men with shoulder boards from the frock coat added to show rank.
- High-ranking mounted officers would sometimes wear double-breasted shell jackets in dark blue. These had the same domed buttons and velvet collar and cuffs as the frock coat.
- The most common color for the army-issue shirt was gray, followed by navy blue or white. The shirt was made of coarse wool and was a pullover style with 3 buttons. It was often replaced with civilian clothing such as white linen or plaid flannel shirt sewn by the soldier's family, this style is known as "homespun".
- Bright red overshirts were often worn as uniforms by volunteer regiments early in the war, modeled on the shield-front shirt worn by Victorian firefighters.
- Overcoats were single-breasted for infantry, double-breasted for cavalry with a rain cape. On campaign, this was sometimes replaced with a rubber poncho for cavalry and artillery, and a gum blanket for infantry, that could double as a groundsheet. Officers' greatcoats were made of dark blue wool and had black braid on front and on the cuffs.
- Depending on region, unit officers' preferences, and other variables; Cadets and the state militias occasionally wore gray.
- The 7th New York National Guard Regiment, (among others), wore cadet gray tail-coats with matching trousers and dark blue epaulettes with white fringe, and 1830s style shakos, as late as 1861. The fatigue and service uniform of the 7th New York was a single-breasted shell jacket, with a 9-button front, and black cuff flashing and shoulder straps, with piped collar trim; and a cadet gray kepi, with a piped crown and dark blue band. This appearance, with their white dress gloves, gave them the nickname of "Kid Glove", when the 7th New York arrived in Washington City, in 1861.

=== Headgear ===
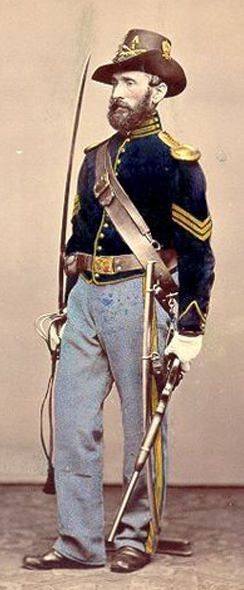
1866 picture of Model showing correct uniform of a Company "A" 1st US Cavalry Sgt wearing Hardee hat

- The Hardee hat was black, with an eagle badge keeping the left side of the brim pinned up. For parades an eagle feather was added, with brass designating the soldier's regiment, company and branch of service (bugle for infantry, cannons for artillery or sabres for cavalry). Western units like the Iron Brigade preferred the Hardee hat as its wide brim provided protection from the sun and rain. These hats were personalized by the men, usually shaped into civilian styles like the center crease, which was the precursor of the cowboy hat.
- Kepis were worn on the campaign and for fatigue duty. The design varied from a tight-fitting cap resembling the one adopted by the French in the 1840s to a tall floppy "bummer's cap" described by the troops as resembling a feedbag. The leather peak could be stiff and rectangular or crescent shaped (known as the McDowell pattern). The hatband was sometimes a contrasting color to the normal blue: yellow for cavalry, red for artillery, or green for medics and soldiers belonging to the Irish Brigade. Officers' kepis might have black or gold braid to display their rank. Early in the war kepis were supplied with a waterproof cover. Other troops purchased a "havelock" which, like the contemporary Foreign Legion cap had a neck flap to protect the wearer from the sun. The havelock was made of a grayish-blue cotton mesh and was not liked by the troops, who usually used them to filter tea or coffee. So their issue was discontinued in the later years.
- Many troops would replace their regulation kepis with civilian hats (normally in black). Popular styles included the slouch hat with either a flat or round top (the latter was issued to the Garibaldi Guard with black feathers added to resemble the Italian bersaglieri hat), pork pie hat, telescope crown hat, flat cap, bowler hat or smoking cap (worn in camp when off-duty)
- Marines were issued tall leather shakos before the war but in the field these were replaced with kepis (often with the red enameled brass M badge from the shako added)
- Early in the war the Mexican War era M1839 forage cap was still in use among some regular soldiers. This peaked cap with a neck flap had officially been replaced by the kepi in 1858, but continued to be issued by quartermasters eager to use up old stock.
- General officers could also wear for undress order a cocked hat with black ostrich plumes and a black rosette surmounted with the U.S. eagle either metallic or embroidered.

=== Sashes ===
Sashes were worn around the waists of NCOs and officers, designating units or specialties by color. For most, including staff officers, the sash was usually Crimson, and shared with Union Marine officers, with the exception of Pay officers, who were the only ones who did not wear them. Other colors were as follows:

- Buff = Generals
- Green = Medical, Sharpshooter and Berdan officers
- Black = Selected Cavalry officers
- Royal Blue = Chaplain officers
- Scarlet = NCOs
- Orange = Dragoon officers (until August 1861)
- Sky Blue = Military academy cadets

=== Trousers ===
- These were sky blue with tin buttons. NCOs had a dark blue (infantry), red (artillery), crimson (ordnance and medical) or yellow (cavalry and engineers) stripe down the leg. The stripes were a half inch wide for corporals, and an inch and a half wide for sergeants and higher rank.
- Regimental officers wore sky blue trousers with an eighth inch welt in the color of the arm of service. Staff officers wore dark blue with a gold welt. Generals and all officers of the Ordnance Department wore plain dark blue trousers.

=== Footwear ===
- Jefferson Davis boots were black with the rough side out, with hobnails and heel irons resembling modern-day dress boots. Recent research suggests smooth-side-out boots were equally common for volunteer regiments.
- Cavalry and artillery were issued calf-high riding boots, originally designed for the drivers of artillery limbers. Some also wore thigh-high trooper boots as protection from the elements and in imitation of European cavalry.
- Gaiters were issued to regular troops, sharpshooters, zouaves and the Iron Brigade but were quickly discarded as impractical.

The enlisted infantry uniform was completed with a black leather belt and oval buckle with the letters US. Officers, NCOs and cavalry troopers were equipped with a sword belt with a rectangular buckle with eagle motif.

== Ranks and insignia ==
=== Officers ===
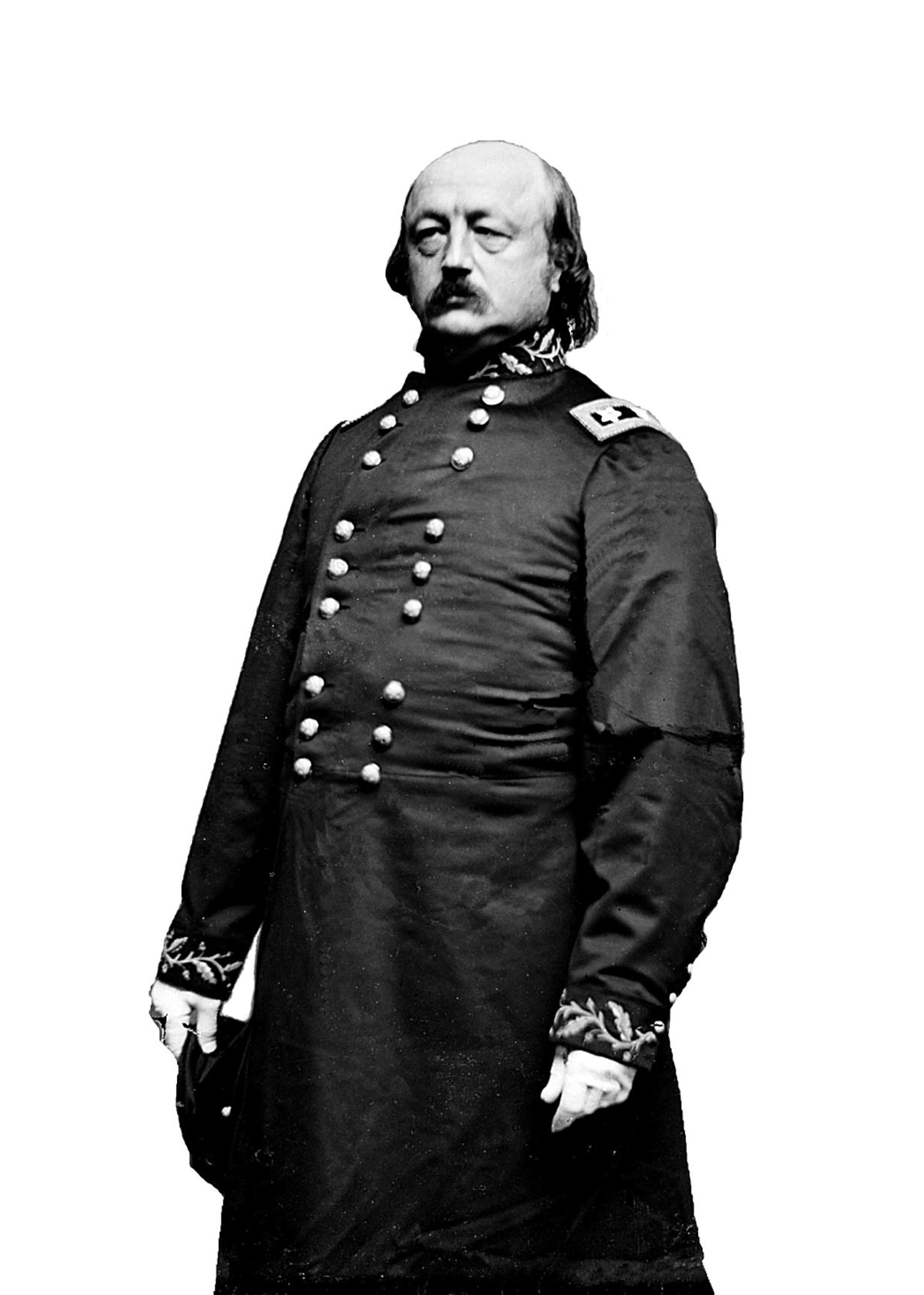
General Butler wearing uniform with sardine box shoulder bars and gold embroidery on the cuffs.

Rank was displayed on epaulettes (dress occasions) or shoulder straps (field duties): no insignia for a second lieutenant, one gold bar for a first lieutenant, two gold bars for a captain, a gold oak leaf for a major, a silver oak leaf for a lieutenant colonel, a silver eagle for a colonel and one, two or three silver stars for a general, depending on his seniority.

On the epaulettes, the bars for captains and first lieutenants were silver and majors wore no badge.

The color of the shoulder boards – with trims in gold braid – were as follows:

- Dark blue: Generals, general staff, judge advocates, medical department, ordnance, pay department, aides-de-camp, adjutants, engineers, inspectors and quartermasters
- Sky blue: Infantry
- Yellow: Cavalry
- Scarlet: Artillery
- Green: Mounted riflemen (until August 1861), Sharpshooters/Berdans
- Orange: Dragoons (until August 1861)

Rank group	General / flag officers			Senior officers			Junior officers
1861–1864
1861–1864	Major general Commanding the Army	Major general	Brigadier general	Colonel	Lieutenant colonel	Major	Captain	First lieutenant	Second lieutenant
1864–1866
1864–1866	Lieutenant general	Major general	Brigadier general	Colonel	Lieutenant colonel	Major	Captain	First lieutenant	Second lieutenant

Contemporary photographs and a Winslow Homer painting, Playing Old Soldier, show staff officers occasionally added their departmental initials within the shoulder straps between the rank insignia. "M.S." for "medical staff" appears to have been the most common.

With the exception of slight changes to the representing insignia for the more junior commissioned grades as well as additional color combinations for new career fields, the shoulder strap insignia and color scheme survives largely unchanged in the modern era on the Army Service Uniform.

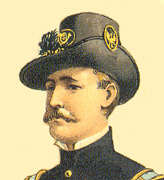
A Union officer sporting the "Jeff Davis" hat adopted in 1858 with eagle motifs

Individual officers would sometimes add gold braid Austrian knots on their sleeves but this practice was uncommon as it made them easy targets and risked friendly fire as this was the standard insignia for Confederate officers.

Nevertheless, many officers personalized their uniforms. For instance, the "Jeff Davis" hat would be pinned back with eagle badges. Many cavalry officers were adorned with eagles and belts with eagle motifs. The designs were based on the Great Seal of the United States.

=== Non-commissioned officers ===
Ranks were worn as chevrons on the right and left sleeves above the elbow. They were colored according to service branch:

- Infantry = Sky Blue
- Artillery = Scarlet
- Cavalry/engineers = Yellow
- Mounted riflemen/sharpshooters/Berdans = Green
- Ordnance sergeants = Crimson
- Dragoons = Orange (until August 1861)

Enlisted rank structure
Sergeant major	Quartermaster sergeant	Ordnance sergeant	First sergeant	Sergeant	Corporal	Musician	Private
						No insignia	No insignia

Brass shoulder scales were worn on dress uniforms, with different features to signify enlisted ranks. Shoulder scales were not normally worn on service or fatigue uniforms. When in full dress and sometimes also in battle, sergeants in non-mounted service branches carried the M1840 NCO sword suspending on a leather belt. Additionally all ranks above sergeant (i.e. first sergeant, ordnance sergeant, hospital steward, sergeant major etc.) wore red worsted waist sashes (In the Confederate States Army, all sergeant ranks wore swords and worsted waist sashes: red for artillery and infantry, yellow for cavalry). Company QM sergeants (with one horizontal bar across the top of the Sgt stripes) worked with the regimental QM sergeants to disperse food and transport company items.

=== Corps ===
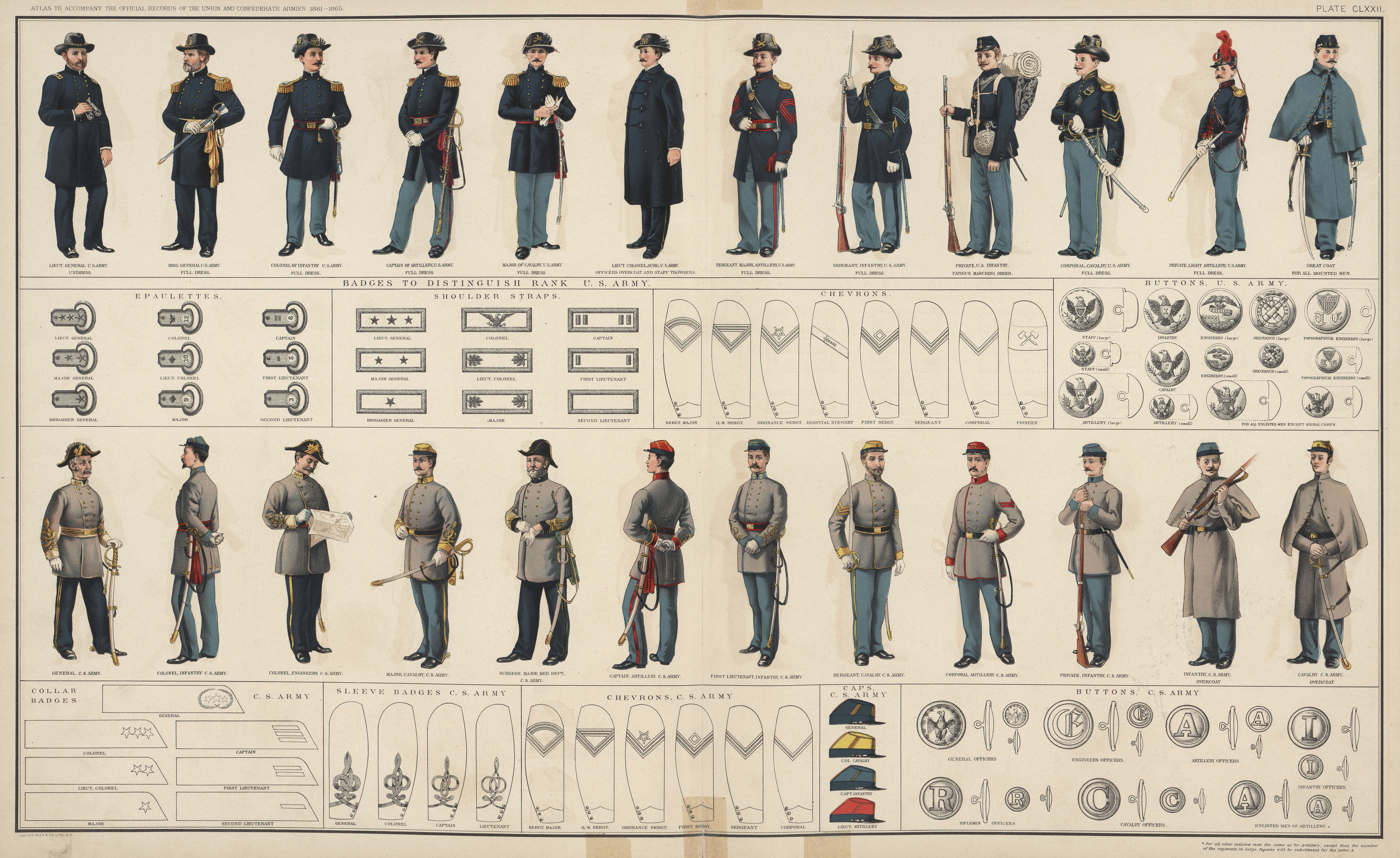
Color plate from the War of the Rebellion Atlas depicting the eagle motif on Union rank insignia.

Corps badges were originally worn by Union soldiers on the top of their army forage cap (kepi), left side of the hat, or over their left breast. The idea is attributed to General Philip Kearny who ordered his men to sew a two-inch square of red cloth on their hats to avoid confusion on the battlefield. This idea was adopted by General Joseph Hooker after he assumed command of the Army of the Potomac, so any soldier could be identified at a distance, and to increase troop morale and unit pride – the badges became immensely popular with the troops, who put them anywhere they could, and the badges accomplished the objectives they had been created for, and the idea soon spread to other corps and departments.

General Daniel Butterfield was given the task of designing a distinctive shape of badge for each corps. Butterfield also designed a badge of each division in the corps a different color.

The badges for enlisted men were cut from colored material, while officer's badges were privately made and of a higher quality. Metallic badges were often made by jewelers and were personalized for the user. The badges eventually became part of the army regulations.

Division badges were colored as follows:

- Red – First division of corps
- White – Second division of corps
- Blue – Third division of corps
- Green – Fourth division of 6th, 9th and 20th corps
- Yellow – Fourth Division of 15th Corps
- Multicolor – Headquarter or artillery elements (certain corps)

== European and civilian influence ==
The uniform itself was influenced by many things, both officers' and soldiers' coats being originally civilian designs.

Leather neck stocks based on the type issued to the Napoleonic-era British Army were issued to the regular army before the war. These were uncomfortable, especially in hot weather, and were thrown away by the men at the first opportunity to be replaced with cotton neckerchiefs, bandanas or (in the case of officers) neckties or cravats.

The basic cut of the uniform adopted in 1851 was French, as was the forage cap worn by some men, and the frock coat was a French invention. However, some parts of the French uniform were ignored, such as enlisted men wearing epaulettes and collar ornaments.

The army went even further than simply having a French-influenced uniform, with some regiments wearing French Imperial Guard voltigeur uniforms, or many even wearing zouave uniforms, such as the 62nd Pennsylvania Infantry, 63rd Pennsylvania Infantry, New York Fire Zouaves as well as the 18th Massachusetts. These consisted of a short blue jacket with red facings, fez, red or blue pants, a red sash and a blue waistcoat with brass buttons or alternatively a red overshirt.

The late-war sack coat was copied from the fatigue jacket worn by the 19th century Prussian Army.

The Hardee hat was inspired by the headgear of the Danish Army but was later abandoned.

== Gallery ==
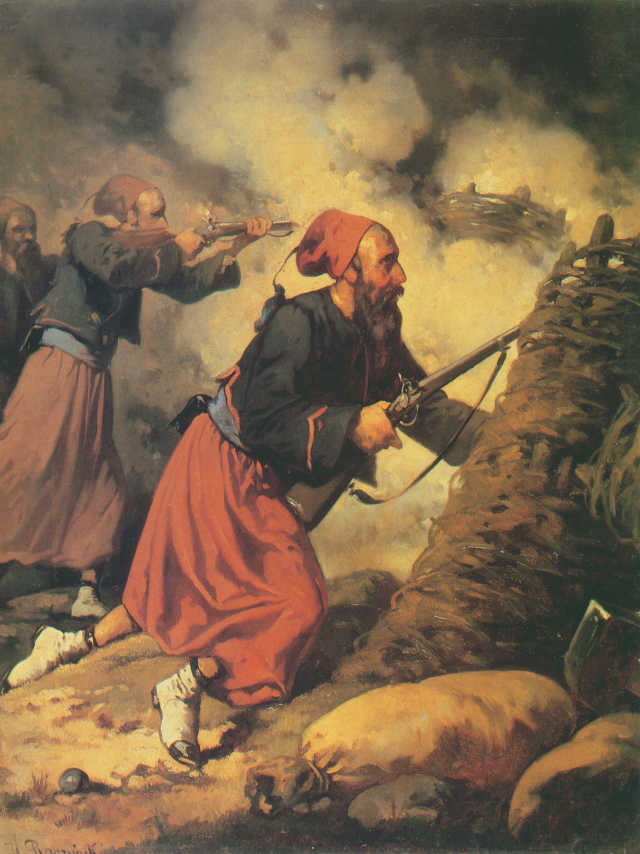
Zouave units wore identical uniforms to their French counterparts [1858 painting Zouaves in Fight]

The uniforms of the Union were deeply influenced by the French ones of the same era (French Light Infantry, above)

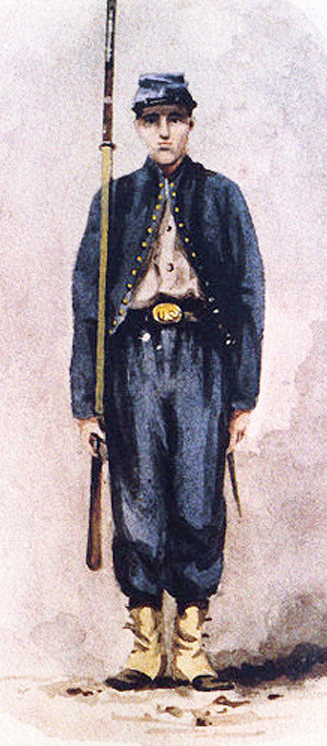
Pvt James Thomas from the 95th Pennsylvania in state-issue shell jacket "Goslin Zouave".

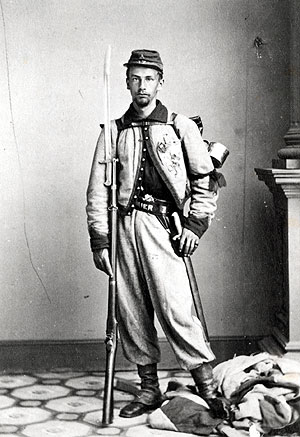
Private Francis Brownwell of the 11th New York Volunteer Infantry regiment-in Zouave Uniform

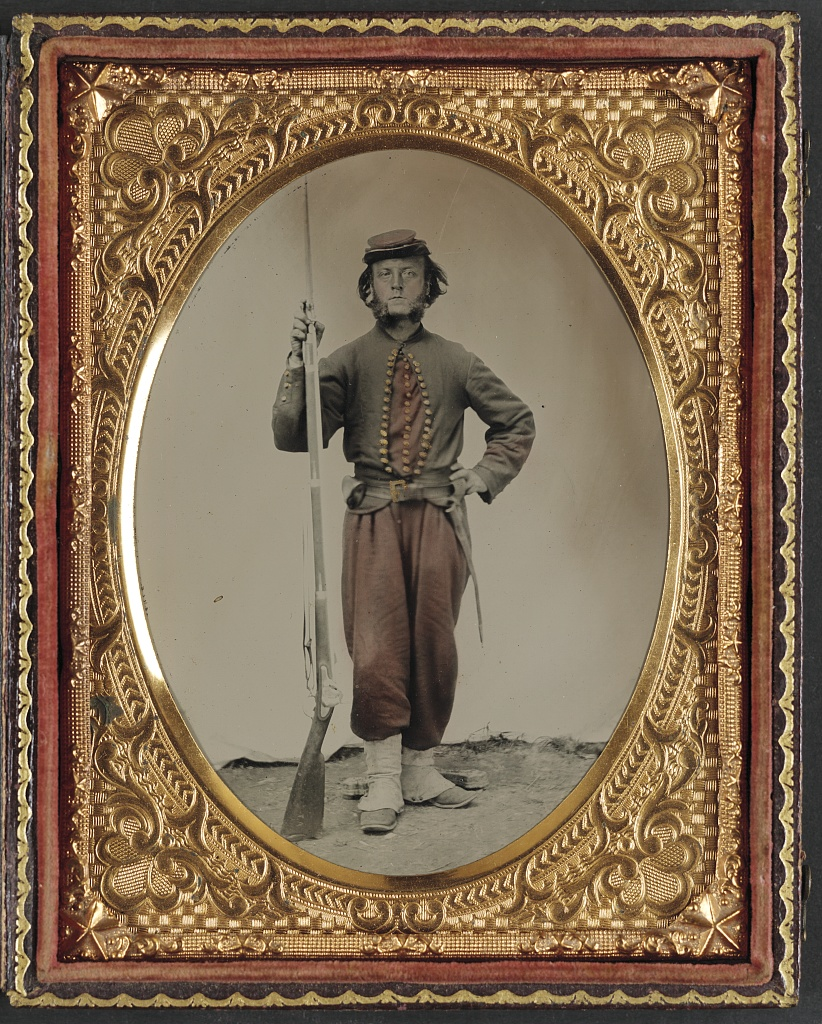
Photograph believed to be Private Alonzo F. Thompson, Company C, 14th Regiment, New York State Militia

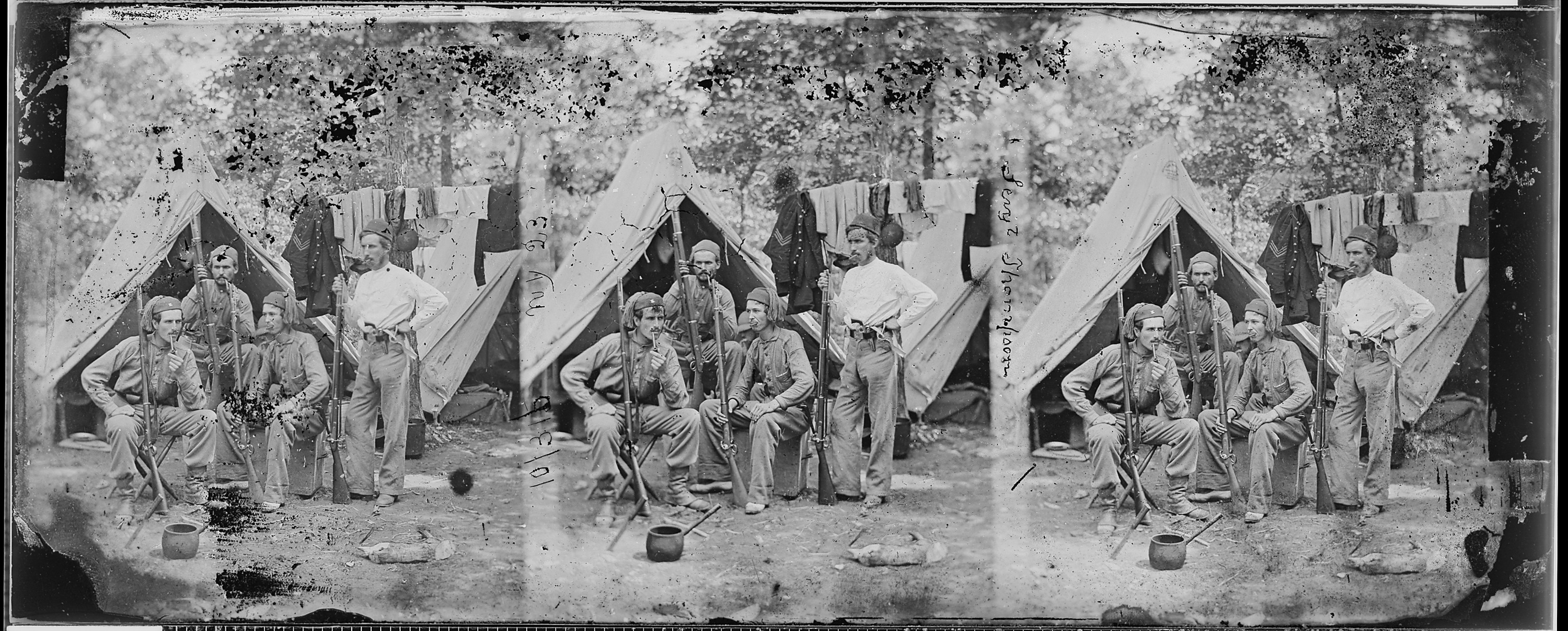
Sergt. Thompson, 23rd N.Y. Volunteers

Usually identified only as a "A Union Volunteer" this picture is of Private Frank C. Filley in the 5th New York State Militia Regiment

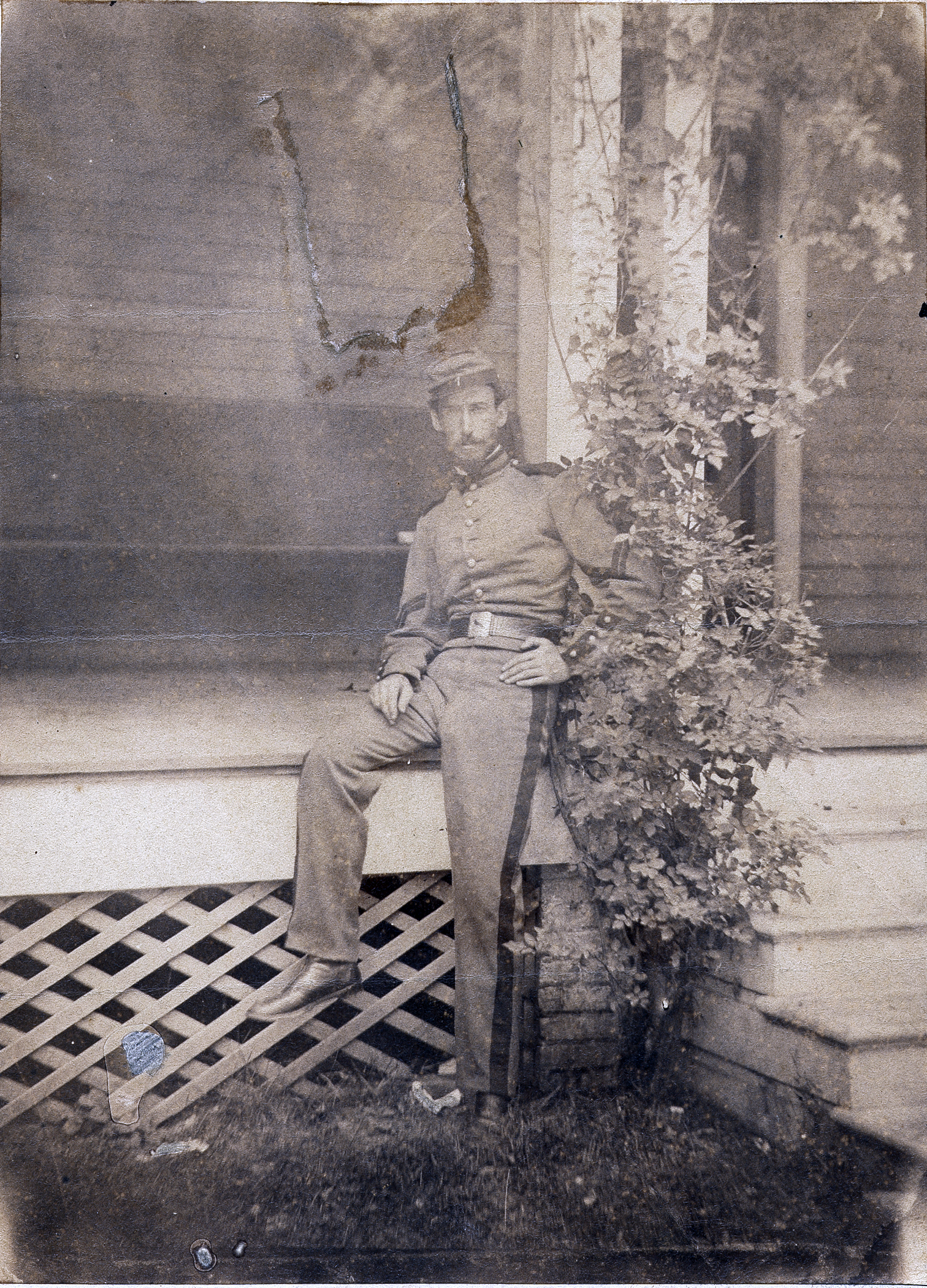
Corporal Sanford Robinson Gifford 7th New York State Militia Regiment

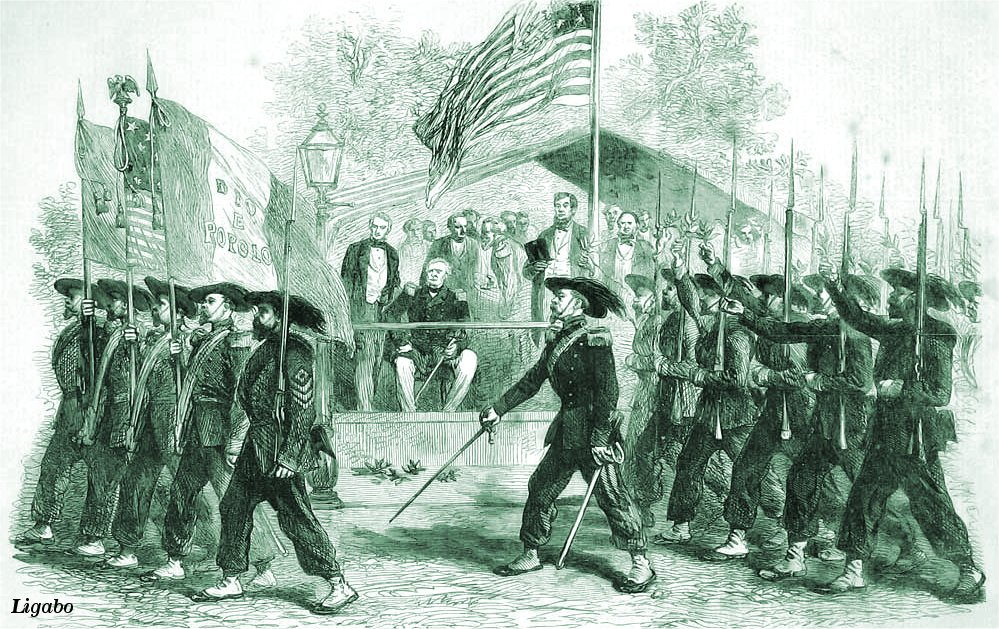
Garibaldi guard wore slouch hats and blue frock coats with red facings

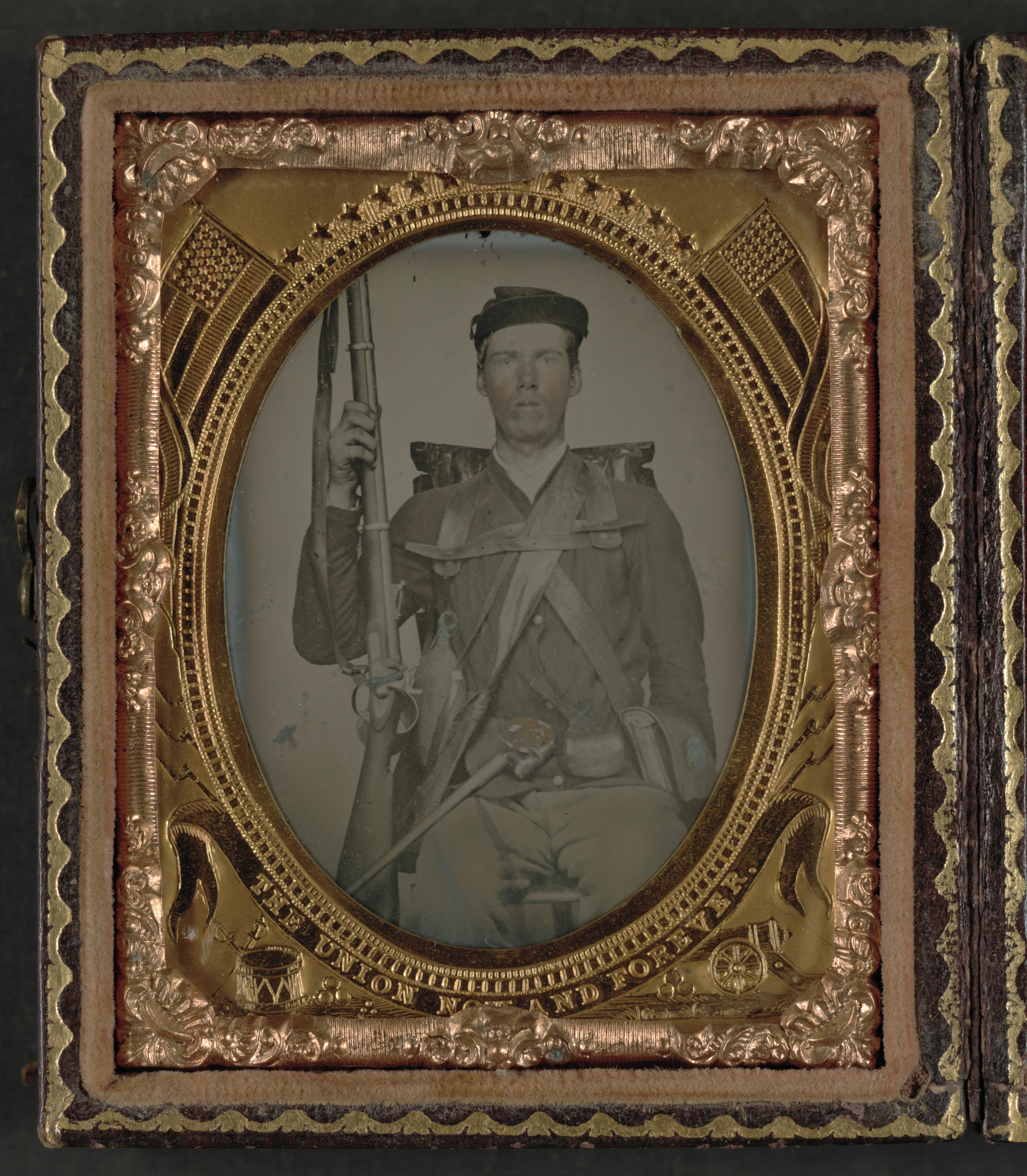
Union Infantry Private in full marching order identified only as "W.H.W'.

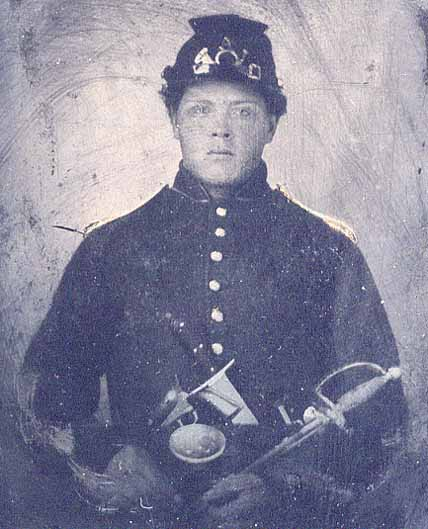
Soldier of a Union army regiment [Bugle horn on cap] although he has no rank he has a Model 1840 army noncommissioned officers' sword

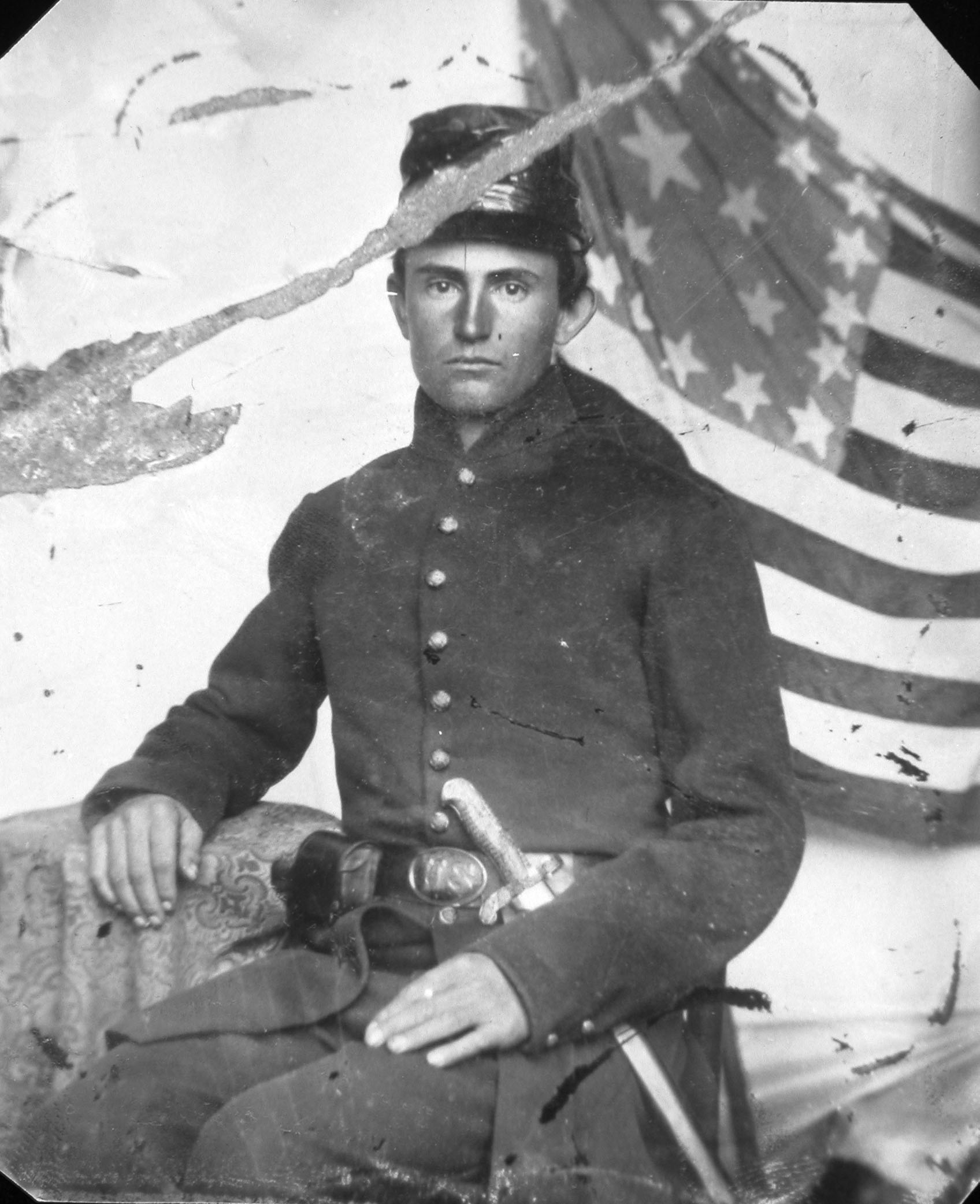
Private Samuel K. Wilson (1841–1865) of the Sturgis Rifles, Illinois Volunteer Infantry, 1862

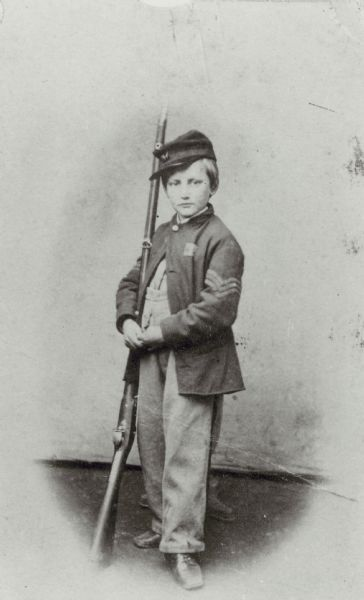
Drummer boy Johnny Clem wearing sack coat and kepi

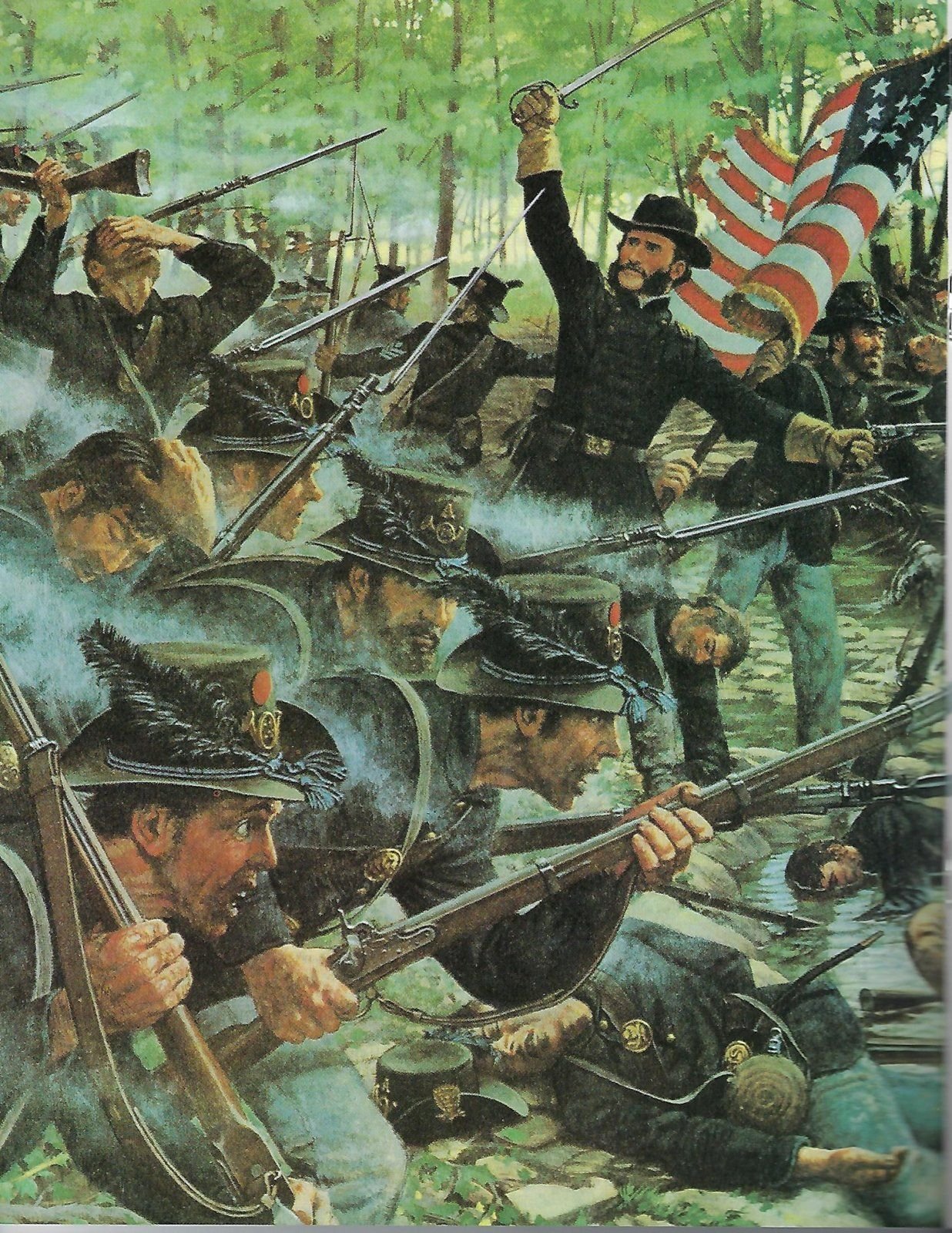
The 24th Michigan Volunteer Infantry at the Battle of Gettysburg, wearing the Model 1858 Hardee Hat of the Iron Brigade.

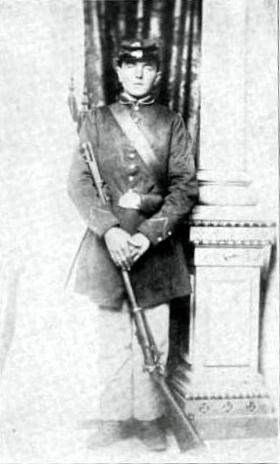
Twenty-year-old German immigrant John Haag of Company B, 26th Wisconsin Volunteer Infantry Regiment (August 1862)

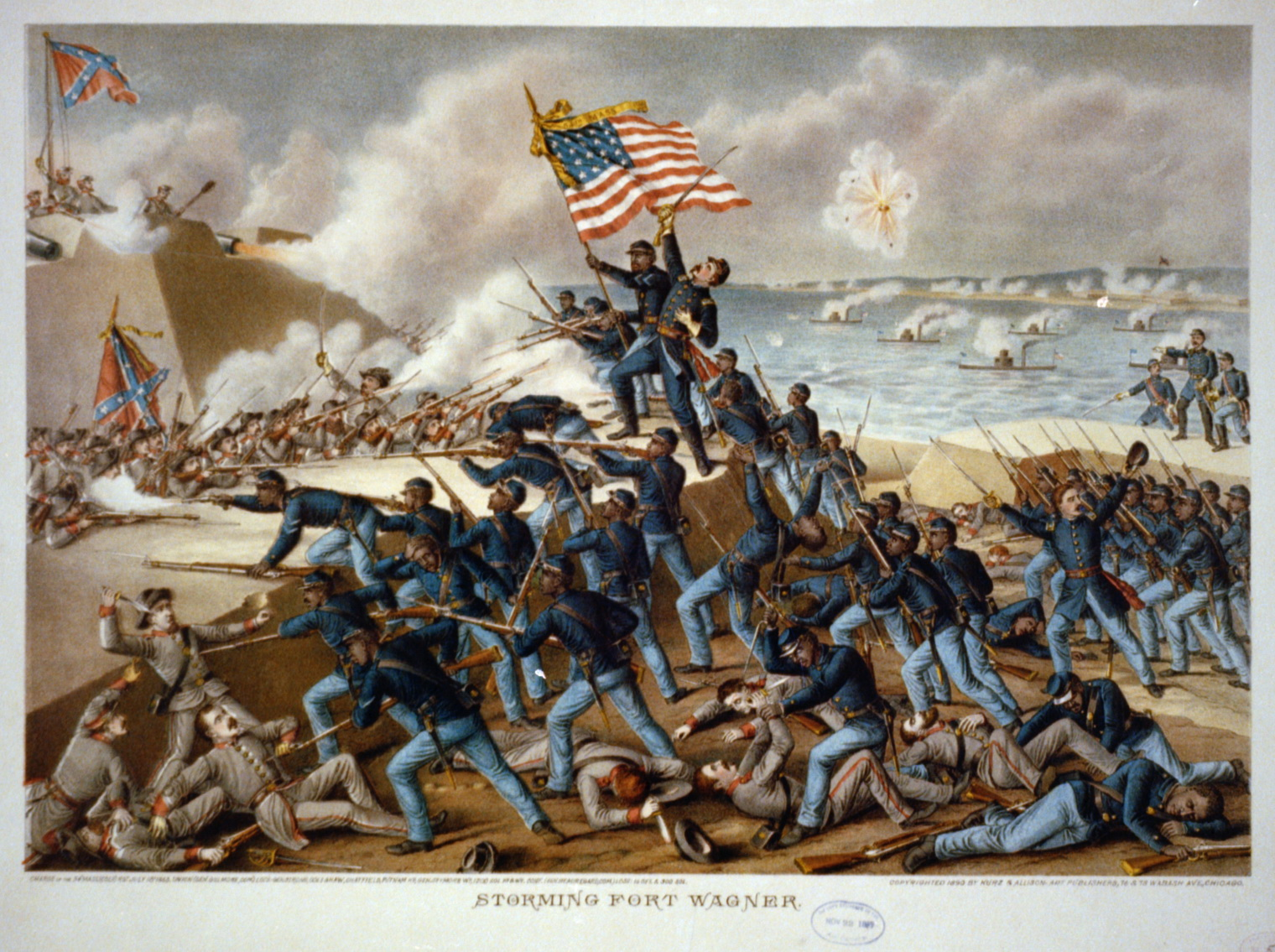
USCT regiment storming Fort Wagner representative of the 54th Massachusetts infantry-as it shows Colonel Shaw as a fatality

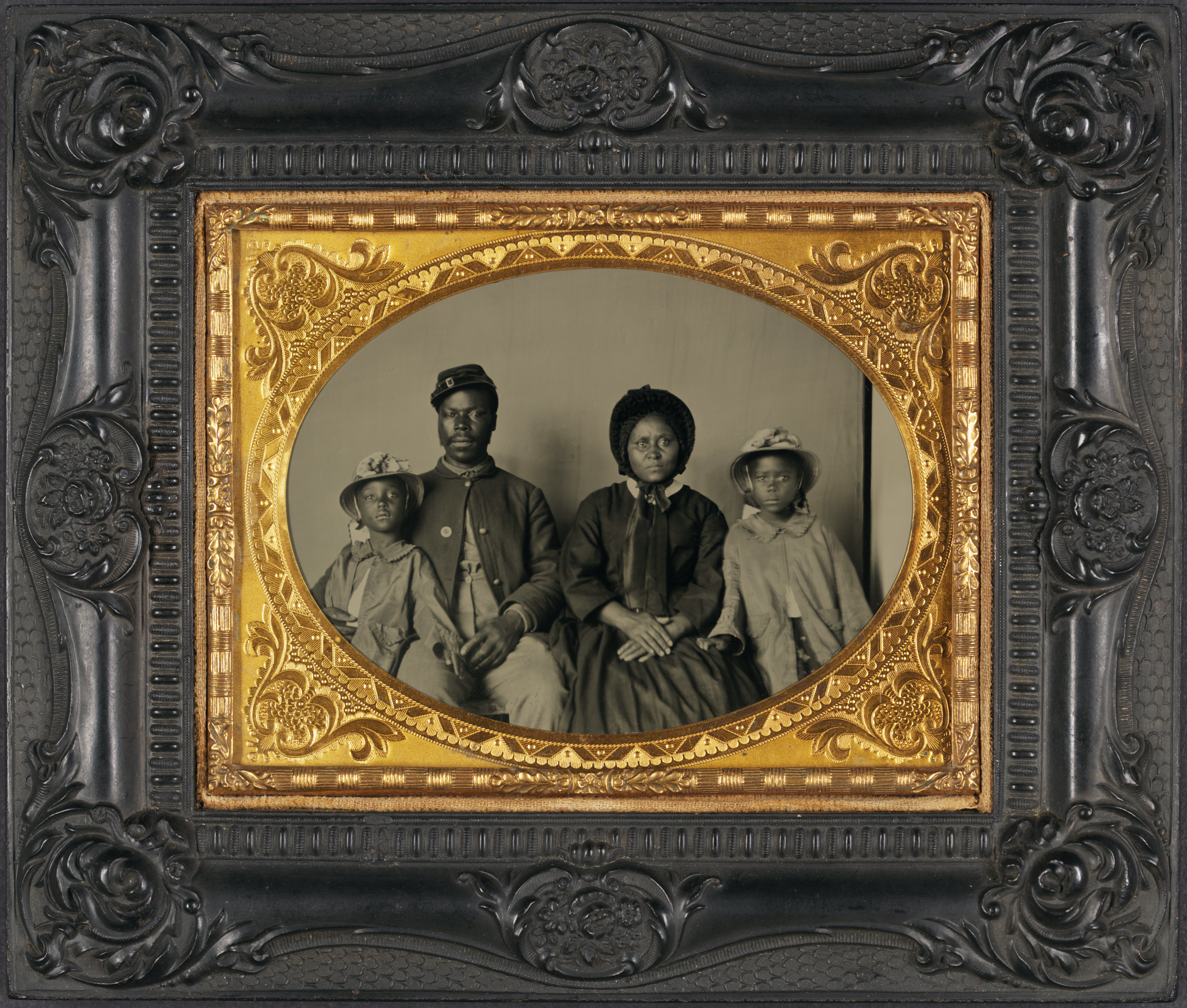
African American Union soldier in uniform with family; he has been identified as Sgt. Samuel Smith of the 119th USCT

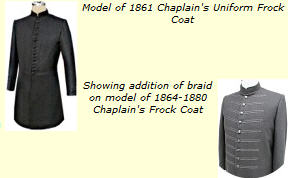
Black frock coat worn on campaign by the regimental padre

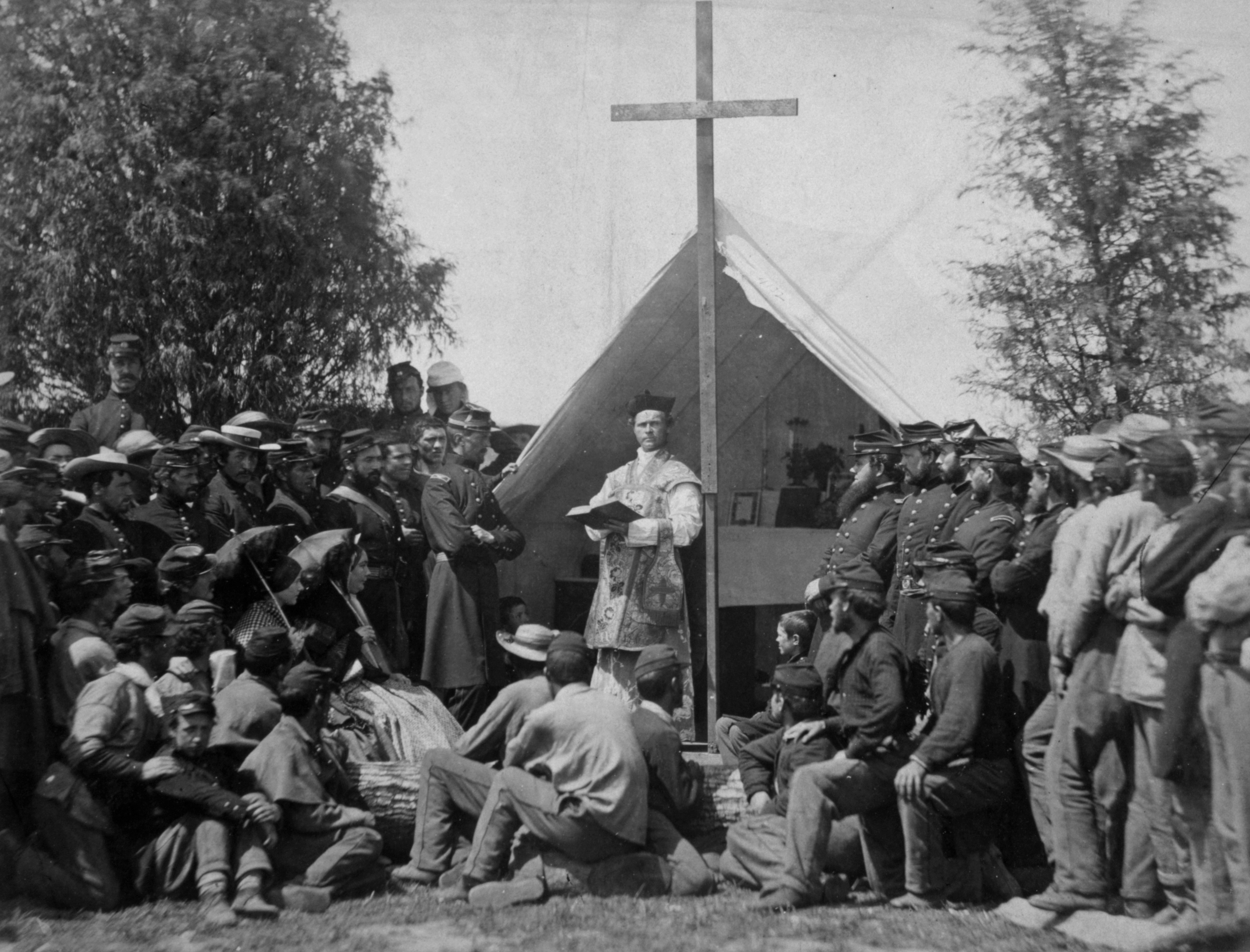
Chaplain leading prayers-69th New York Infantry Irish Brigade. Note the use of civilian hats by the men.

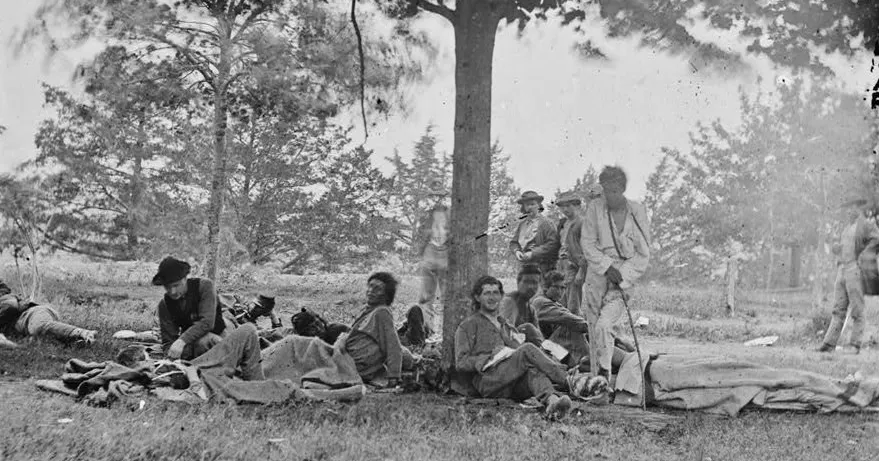
wounded Native American members of Company K, 1st Michigan Sharpshooters Regiment during the Overland Campaign, note the non-regulation uniforms some of the Natives used in the regiment.

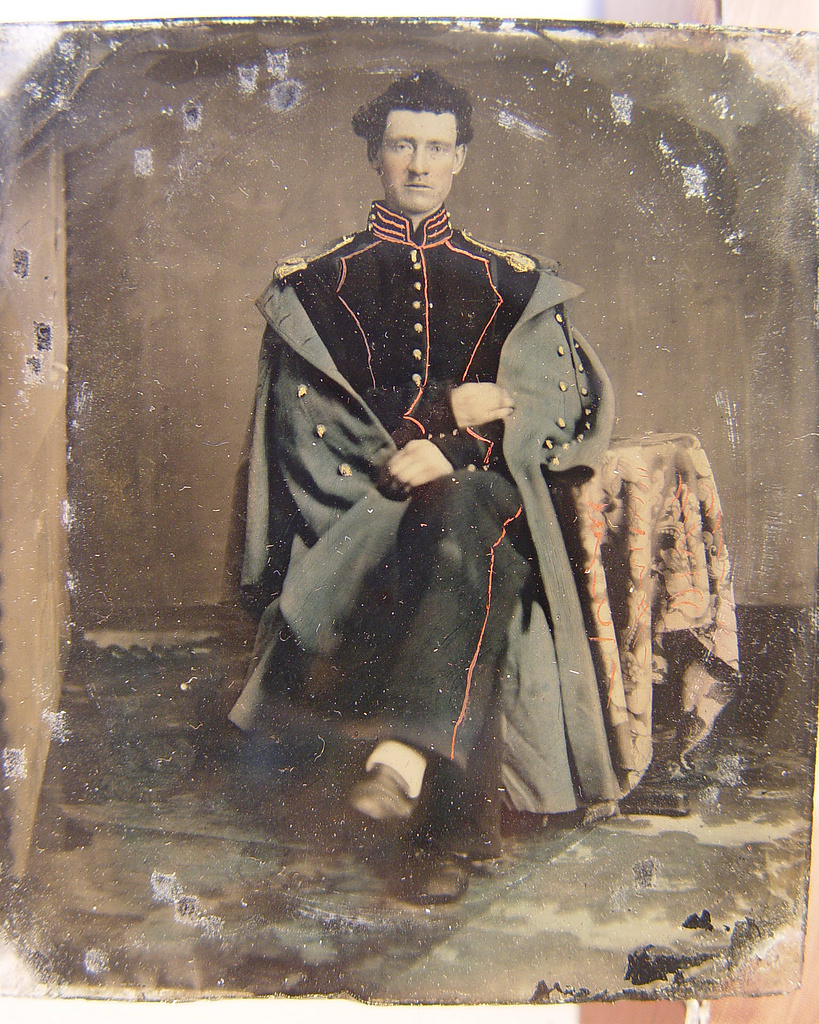
Regulation artillery musician's uniform with "birdcage" chest piping [identified soldier of Independent Battery 'B' (Artillery), Pennsylvania Volunteers, Private William P. Haberlin, who was killed in action on Dec. 16, 1864, at Nashville, Tennessee.]

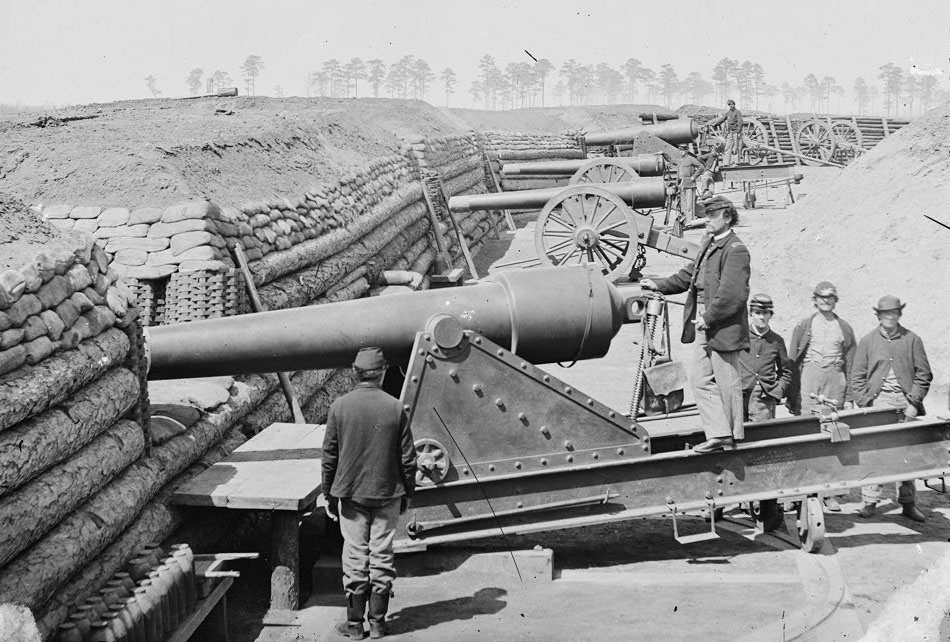
Ft Brady Va-Company C 1st CT heavy Artillery. Gun crew wearing the late-war sack coat. The officer's private purchase blue wool jacket is based on a typical civilian style. The soldier with his back to the camera has a pair of riding boots and several of the men wear civilian hats

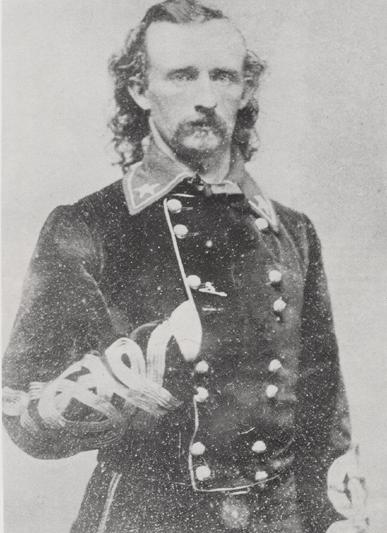
Custer's personalized uniform with Austrian knots, yellow piping and a non-regulation red fireman's shirt with a Brigadier-General's star embroidered on the collar points.

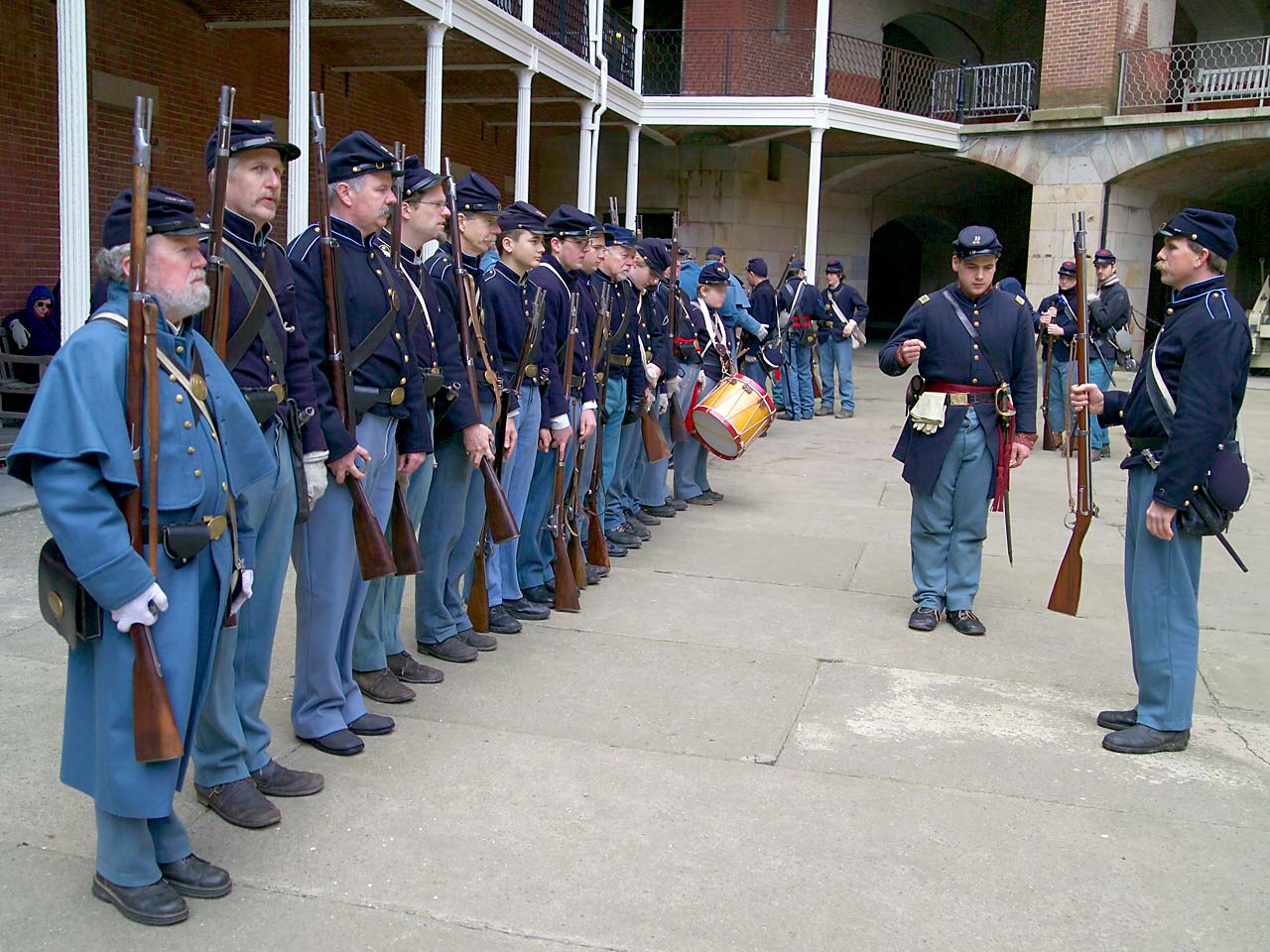
Civil War re-enactors wearing shell jackets, kepis and greatcoats

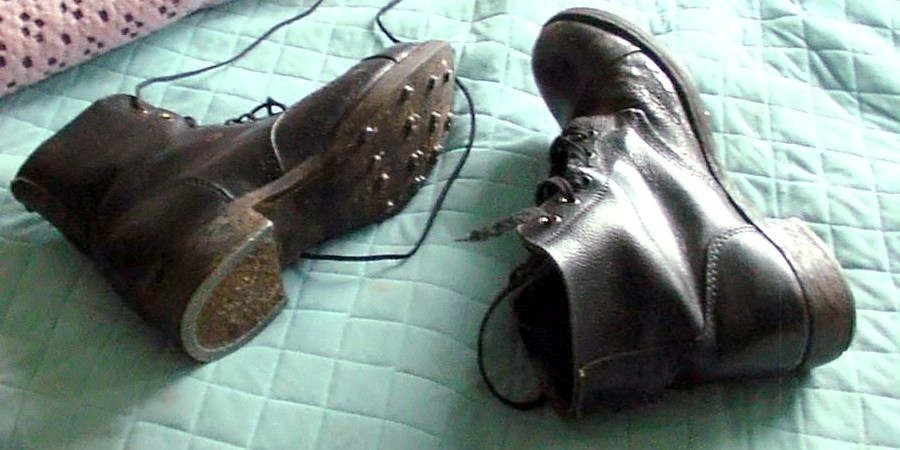
Replica Jeff Davis boots used by historical reenactor

== See also ==
- American Civil War
- Union Army
- Uniforms of the Confederate military
- Uniforms of the United States Army
- Headgear of the United States Army
