= Buka cloak =

Cloak worn by Noongar peoples of Australia

A buka (also boka or booka) is a cloak traditionally worn by Noongar peoples, the Indigenous peoples of south-west Western Australia, and by the Indigenous peoples of South Australia.

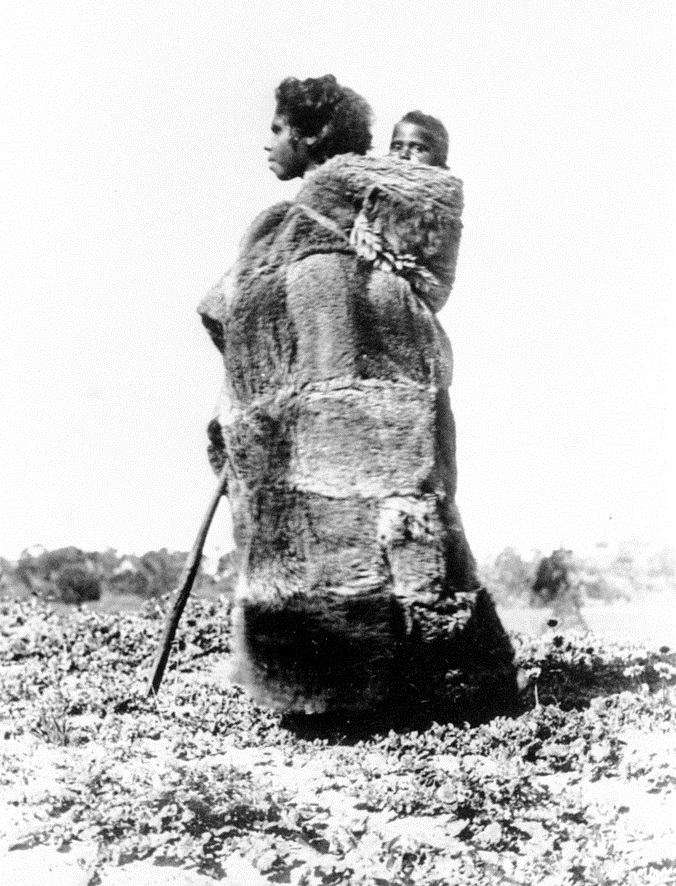
Aboriginal woman in a kangaroo skin cloak carrying a child, c. 1860

Unlike in the south-east, where peoples such as Yorta Yorta wore possum-skin cloaks, Noongar peoples generally use the pelt of the kangaroo. While in the southeast, there was much sewing involved, there was less involved in the south-west where large skins were sewn together instead. The buka normally consists of the whole skin of two to three kangaroos sewn together, with the tail hanging at the bottom of the cloak. The skins were sewn together using kangaroo sinew or rushes.

The cloak was worn over one shoulder and under the other. It was fastened at the neck using a small piece of bone or wood. Wearing the cloak in this way allowed for unrestricted movement of both arms, enabling daily activities to be carried out with ease. Cloaks were reversible: they were worn with the fur on the inside when it was particularly cold, and could be turned the other way when it was raining. The cloaks were also used as rugs to sleep on at night.

Today many Aboriginal people have new cloaks and rugs made from kangaroo skins. They are used in performances or worn for warmth. Ken Wyatt, Australia's first Indigenous cabinet minister, wore a traditional buka when delivering his first speech to parliament in 2010.
