= Possum-skin cloak =

Clothing worn by Aboriginal people in the south-east of Australia

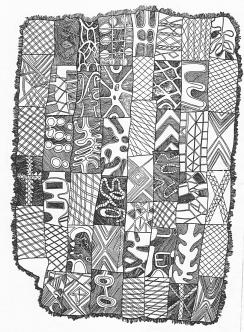
Sewn and incised possum-skin cloak of Gunditjmara origin (Melbourne Museum)

Possum-skin cloaks were a form of clothing worn by Aboriginal people in the south-east of Australia – present-day Victoria, South Australia and New South Wales. In Western Australia, Buka cloak was worn. They are made from pelts of various possum species.

The cloaks were made from numerous possum pelts sewn together with kangaroo sinew, and often decorated with significant incisions on the inside such as clan insignias. They were rubbed with mixture of resin, ochre and fat to both decorate and protect them.

As well as being a significant means of keeping warm in this often chilly part of Australia, there was much importance around the making of the cloaks and their wearing. They were handed down through generations as heirlooms. As with most Australian Aboriginal belongings, there were many uses for the one thing – the cloaks were also used as blankets, mattresses and to wrap babies.

== History ==
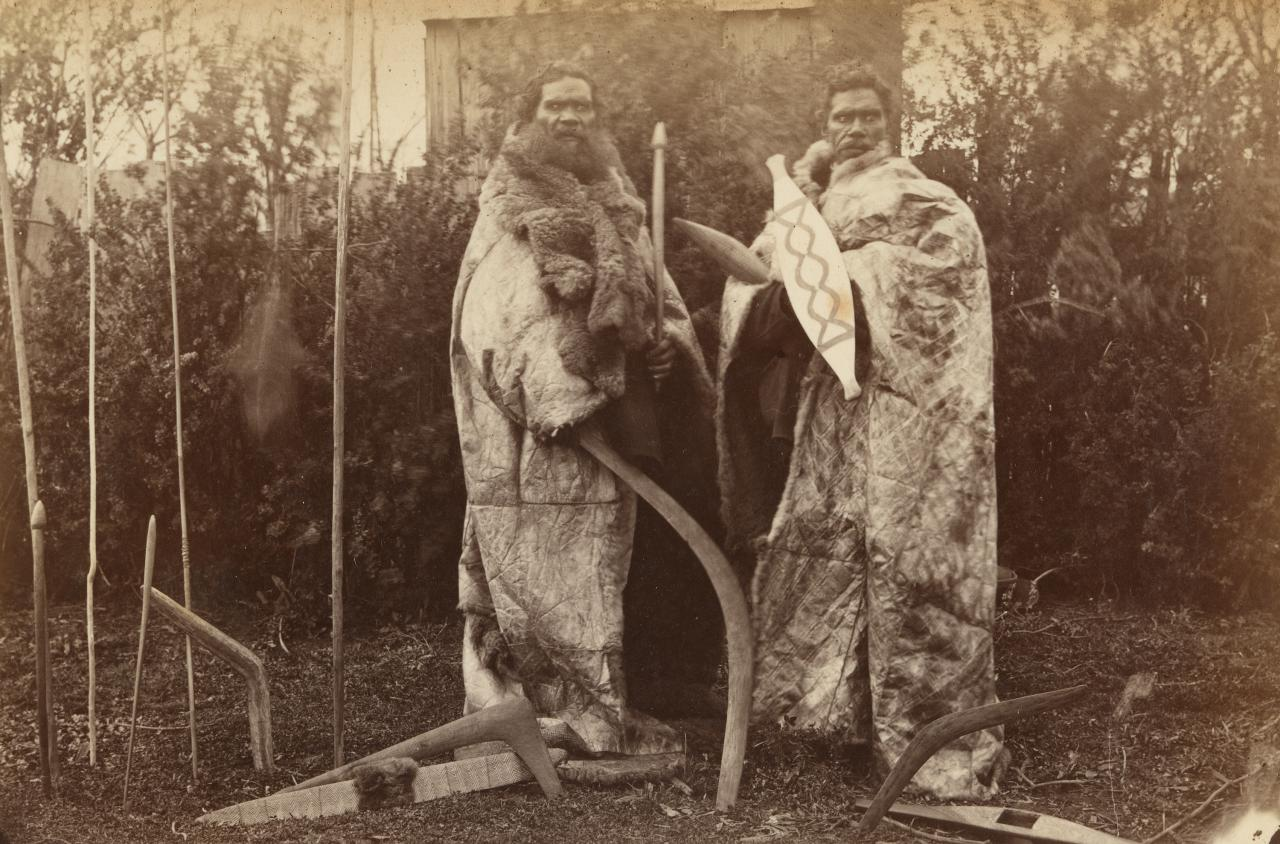
Aboriginal men in Victoria with war implements (c. 1883) by Fred Kruger

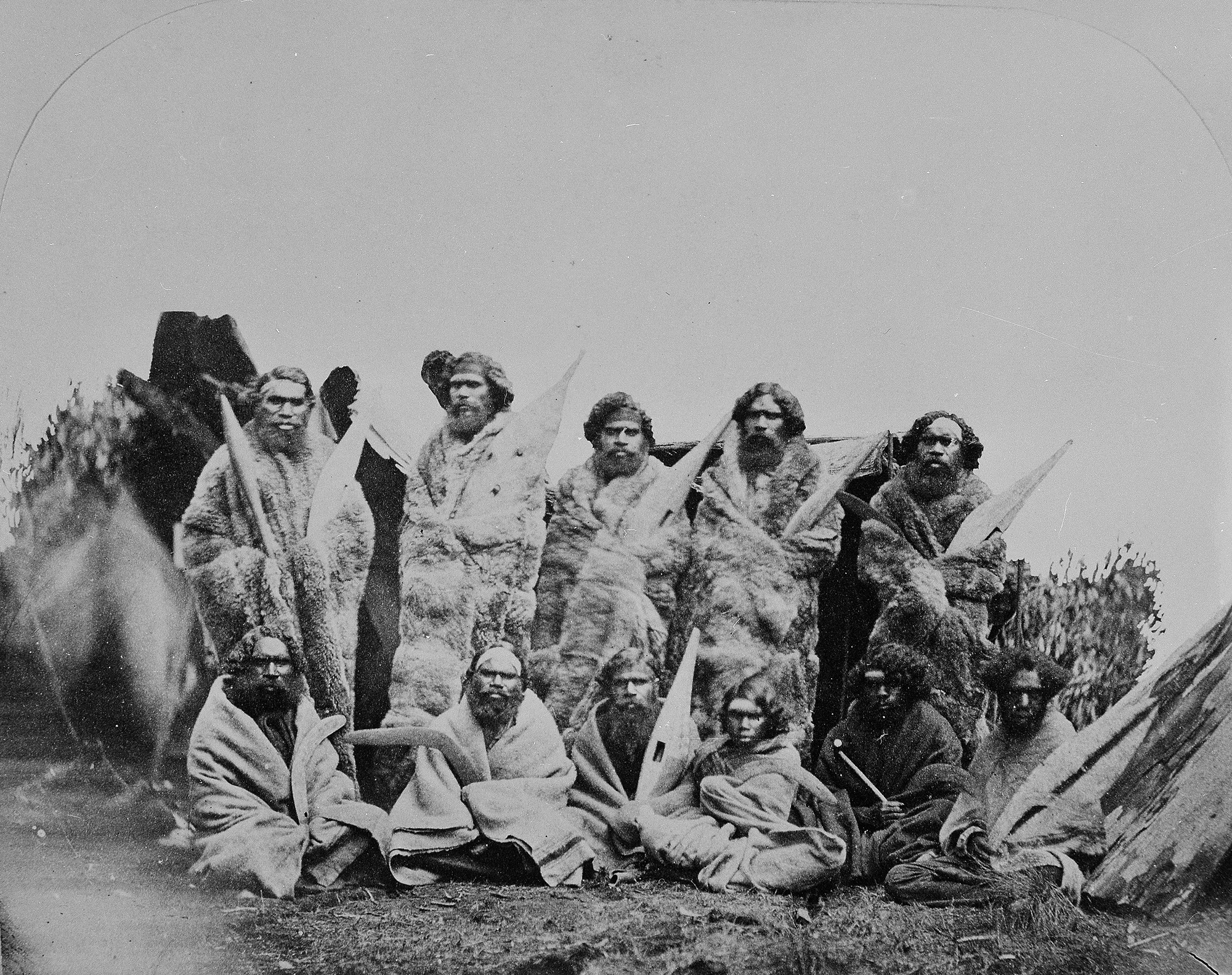
A group of Aboriginal men in possum skin cloaks and blankets in 1858 at Penshurst in Victoria

In the 1800s Governor Lachlan Macquarie, after inspecting the recently forged road across the Blue Mountains west of Sydney, wrote about meeting some members of the Wiradjuri at the Bathurst camp:

They were all clothed with Mantles made of the skins of o'possums which were very neatly sewn together and the outside of the skins were carved in a remarkably neat manner. They appear to be very inoffensive and cleanly in their persons.

The warm and weather-proof possum skin cloaks were also recognised and appreciated by European settlers in the outback, where they became a highly regarded personal item. Alexander Harris describes one as follows from his personal knowledge in the early 1830s:

... the opossum [of a large species] trapped by the wandering shepherd for amusement, as he follows his flock along by the woodside, furnish the material for a blanket [or cloak, to use the phrase of the country] of the most luxurious, furry softness. Sixty-three [9 x 7] of these skins are the stated complement for one blanket or cloak; when made it is large enough doubled to envelope a tall man completely beyond head and feet. As a bed and blanket in one, there is, I suppose, nothing on earth that surpasses it, whilst as a protection against a day's rain it is as efficacious as a roof of a house.

They are also reasonably common in accounts of the gold rush period of the mid-19th century, but gradually became rarities, and restricted to observations of Aboriginal people encountered on the margins of white settlement.

== Decline in use ==
As Aboriginal people were dispossessed of their land, the making and wearing of cloaks became rarer. In addition, white missionaries and others were very efficient in the distribution of clothing and blankets to Aboriginal communities which, over a few generations, caused the tradition of possum skin cloak making to die out.

== Possum skin cloaks today ==
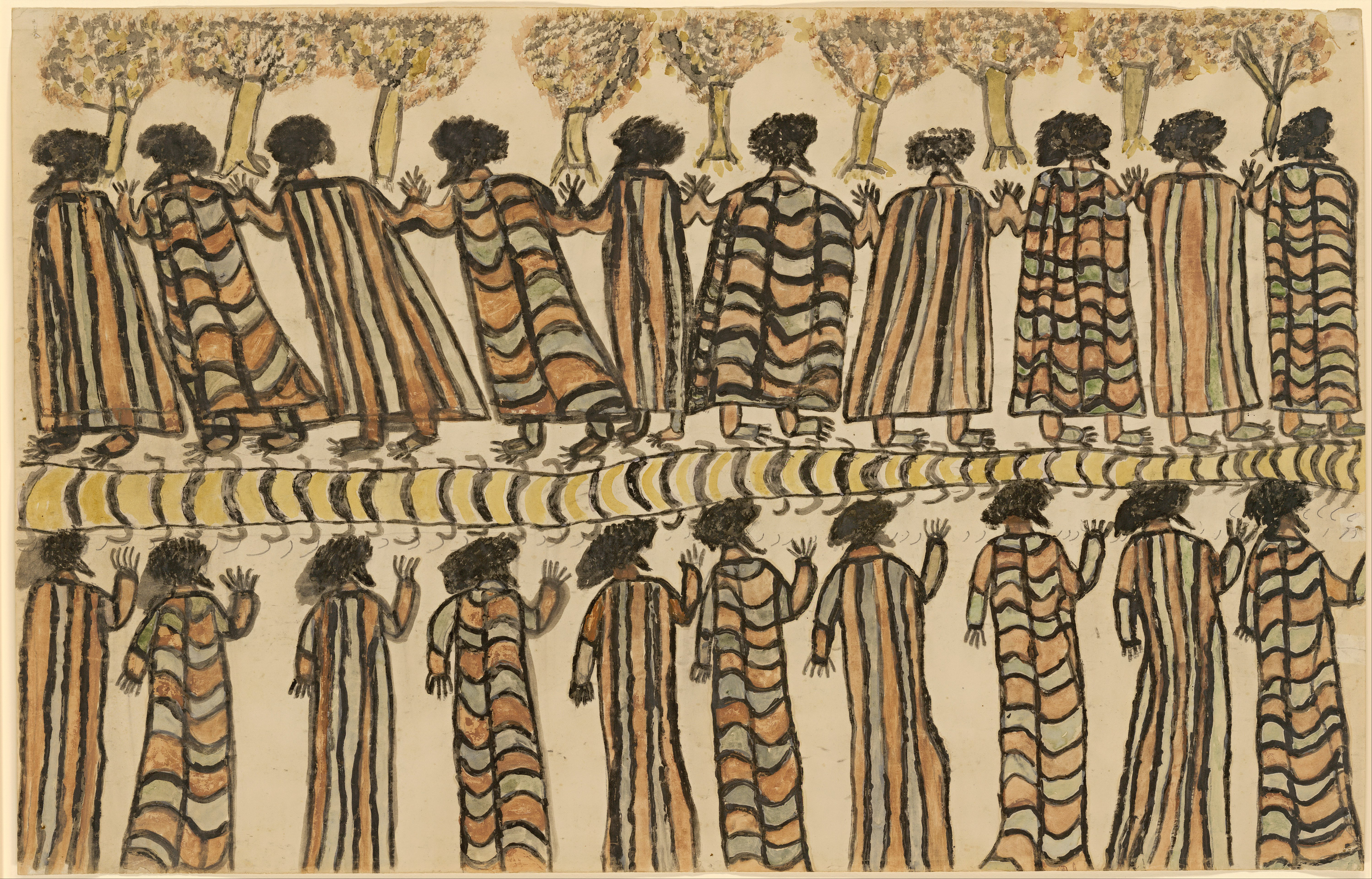
Figures in possum-skin cloaks, 1898 by Aboriginal artist William Barak

Two possum-skin cloaks are in Museum Victoria's collection. One, which dates from 1853, is made from 83 possum skins. There are also cloaks at the National Museum of Australia in Canberra, as well as four in overseas collections. The Krowathunkooloong Keeping Place, a museum of the Gunaikurnai nation in Bairnsdale in regional Victoria, also has possum skin cloaks on display; in the Gunai language they were called batha maruk.

Wrapped in a Possum Skin Cloak, by Amanda Reynolds, Debra Couzens, Vicki Couzens, Lee Darroch and Treahna Hamm, tells the story of some south-eastern Aboriginal people, two Gunditjmara women and two Yorta Yorta women, who set out in 1999 to relearn the lost craft of possum-skin cloak-making.

== See also ==
- Buka cloak
