= Donkey jacket =

Type of workwear jacket

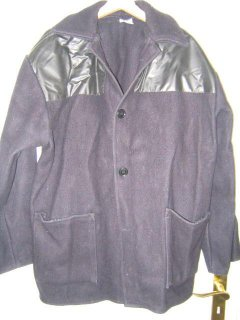
A donkey jacket with PVC panels

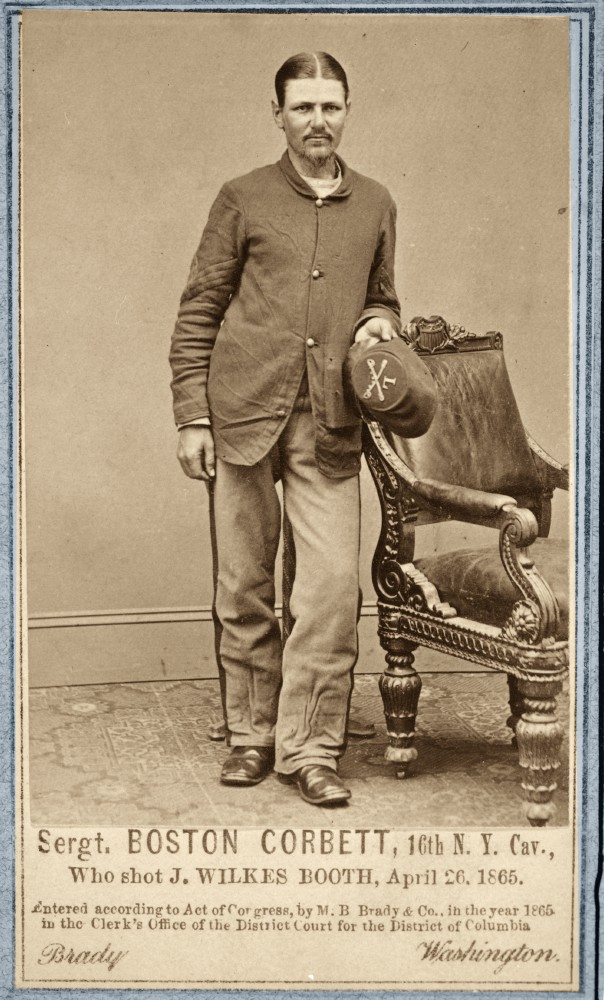
Sack coat: the precursor to the donkey jacket worn from the mid Victorian era onwards by workers and soldiers. These did not have the leather shoulder patches of the modern work jacket. (Caption refers to Boston Corbett and John Wilkes Booth.)

A donkey jacket is a medium-length workwear jacket, typically made of unlined black or dark blue thick Melton woollen fabric, with the shoulders back and front reinforced and protected from rain with leather or PVC panels, which originated in the United Kingdom.

The garment is untailored at the waist, so that it hangs down straight from the shoulders. The front vertical edges fall straight and are squared-off at the bottom edge, which is also straight horizontally with no vent at the back. It reaches 3 to 4 inches (8 to 10 cm) below the crotch area. It has no lapels and is closed by four to five buttons at the front that fasten tightly up to the neck, with a broad and stiff turn-up collar which allows the wearer to protect the neck from wind, cold and wet weather. It is thus well suited to outdoors work in demanding conditions.

== Origins ==
In 1888 George Key opened up his own shop above his father John Key's first-floor draper shop on Lower Brook Street in Rugeley, Staffordshire, England. That same year, Key developed a new type of coat made of a hard-wearing material for the navvies who were working on the construction of the Manchester Ship Canal. Some of them worked on donkey engines (a steam-powered winch or logging engine), providing a name for George Key's new coat: the donkey jacket.

== Design ==
The donkey jacket is derived from the wool sack coat worn by workers in the 19th century, and the Oxford English Dictionary references the term as first used in 1929: "one with leather shoulders and back". The jacket usually has two capacious side pockets, and sometimes an inside "poacher's pocket".

Later versions replaced the leather with a PVC panel covering the shoulderblade areas. This could be fluorescent orange or yellow, and is sometimes branded with the name of the company which supplied the jacket, or of the wearer's employer.

== Social significance ==
The donkey jacket is regarded as typical of the British manual labourer and trade unionist as well as members of the political left. It is also favoured by traditionalist Teddy boys, Rockabillys and skinheads. Former British Labour Party leader Michael Foot was criticised for wearing what was described incorrectly as a "donkey jacket" at a Remembrance Day wreath-laying ceremony and he was shown wearing one on several covers of the satirical magazine Private Eye. Foot's office insisted it was actually a "very expensive short overcoat" chosen by his wife, from Harrods.
