= Melton (cloth) =

Type of wool cloth

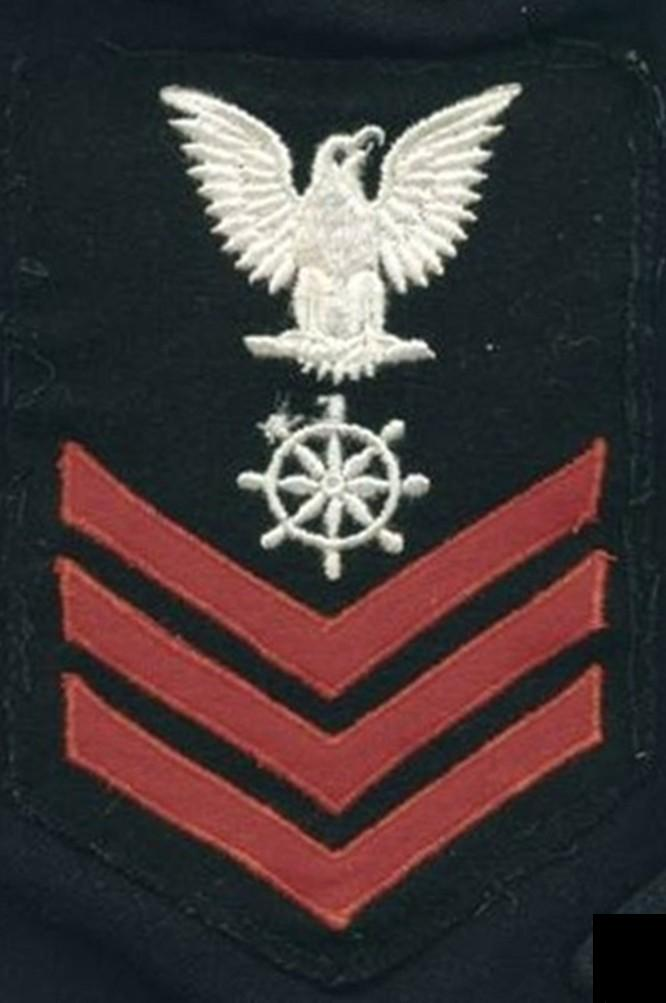
Navy blue melton wool rate for Quartermaster First Class worn between 1940-1945.

Melton cloth, woven in a twill form and traditionally made of wool, is a very solid cloth whose finishing processes completely conceal the twill weave pattern. It is thick, because of having been well fulled, which gives it a felt-like smooth surface, and is napped and very closely sheared. Melton is similar to Mackinaw cloth. Because of its dense, quasi-felted texture it frays minimally or not at all. It is hard-wearing and wind- and weather-resistant. Its main use is for heavy outer garments and coats and for blankets. In lighter weights melton cloth is traditionally used for lining the underside of jacket collars.

It was developed in the Leicestershire town of Melton Mowbray, from which it derives its name. This town is the traditional centre of English fox-hunting, and black and scarlet hunting coats are traditionally made from melton cloth, for its weatherproof qualities. In England not only is melton used for the scarlet hunting coat, an iconic symbol of the upper-class elite, but it is also used in black for the donkey jacket, an iconic symbol of the working class labouring man. Both uses rely on its weatherproof qualities.

Melton cloth is also used as the covering for real (as against lawn) tennis balls.

Queen Victoria commissioned curtains made of Melton cloth for Windsor Castle, the curtains being made by the Leeds textile manufacturing firm William Lupton and Co.

== Admiralty cloth ==
Admiralty cloth was a term for standard melton used for officer's uniform such as coats, and jackets etc.
