= 2026 in paleontology =

Paleontology or palaeontology is the study of prehistoric life forms on Earth through the examination of plant and animal fossils. This includes the study of body fossils, tracks (ichnites), burrows, cast-off parts, fossilised feces (coprolites), palynomorphs and chemical residues. Because humans have encountered fossils for millennia, paleontology has a long history both before and after becoming formalized as a science. This article records significant discoveries and events related to paleontology that occurred or were published in the year 2026.

== Flora ==
=== Fungi ===
==== Newly named fungi ====
Name	Novelty	Status	Authors	Age	Type locality	Country	Notes	Images
Helicoonites grayensis	Sp. nov	Valid	Worobiec & Worobiec in Worobiec, Worobiec & Liu	Pliocene	Gray Fossil Site	United States (Tennessee)	A member of Ascomycota of uncertain affinities.	
Hermatomycesporites	Gen. et sp. nov		Garcia Massini et al.	Jurassic	La Matilde Formation	Argentina	A mitosporic fungus with similarities to Hermatomyces. Genus includes new species H. patagonicus.	
Meliolinites mycoparasitica	Sp. nov		Kundu & Khan	Miocene		India	A member of the family Meliolaceae.	
Neomycoleptodiscus palaeoindicus	Sp. nov		Kundu & Khan	Miocene		India	A member of the family Muyocopronaceae.	
Palaeoarkaya	Gen. et sp. nov		Mudie et al.	Pleistocene		Sea of Marmara	An acritarch with probable affinities with chytrid fungi. Genus includes new species P. similis.	
Papulosporonites canadensis	Comb. nov		(Srivastava)	Late Cretaceous (Campanian-Maastrichtian)		Canada; United States	Fungal spores; moved from Palambages canadiana Srivastava (1968).	
Papulosporonites polycellularis	Comb. nov		(Takahashi & Shimono)	Probably Pleistocene		Japan	Fungal spores; moved from Palambages polycellularis Takahashi & Shimono (1980).	
Parolactarius	Gen. et sp. nov		Lin et al.	Cretaceous	Kachin amber	Myanmar	A fungus with probable affinities with the family Russulaceae. Genus includes new species P. pilosus.	
Polyadosporites colonicus	Comb. nov		(Trivedi & Verma)	Eocene		Malaysia	Fungal spores; moved from Palambages colonicus Trivedi & Verma (1969).	
Vizellopsidites miocenicus	Sp. nov		Kundu & Khan	Miocene		India	An ascomycotal fungus with similarities to modern Vizellopsis.	
Wenganomyces	Gen. et sp. nov		Qu et al.	Ediacaran	Doushantuo Formation	China	A lichen-like fossil providing evidence of fungal-algal symbiotic associations in the Ediacaran. The type species is W. primitivus.	
Zygosporium bivesiculam	Sp. nov		Kundu & Khan	Miocene		India	A member of Xylariales belonging to the family Zygosporiaceae.	

==== Mycological research ====
- Xie et al. (2026) study fungal decay structures in Agathoxylon wood from the Upper Triassic (Norian) strata of the Löwenstein Formation (Germany), and interpret the studied wood as affected by both white rot and brown rot.
- Rea, Simpson & Wizevich (2026) study a sample of the ichnofossil Eopolis ekdalei from the Brushy Basin Member of the Morrison Formation (Utah, United States) preserved with plant, insect and fungal remains interpreted as suggesting that Eopolis ekdalei was produced by termite, as well as suggestive of fungal farming by termites during the Late Jurassic.
- Baker & Casadevall (2026) report evidence from the study the Cretaceous-Paleogene boundary section from the Denver Basin in Colorado (United States) indicative of elevated fungal abundance approximately 30,000 to 10,000 years before the Cretaceous–Paleogene extinction event and coinciding with the Poladpur phase of the Deccan Traps volcanism, as well as evidence of a fungal bloom in North America immediately after the Chicxulub impact.
- Worobiec, Worobiec & Liu (2026) report the discovery of spores assignable to the genus Potamomyces from the Pliocene strata from the Gray Fossil Site (Tennessee, United States), representing the northernmost record of the genus in North America known to date, and interpreted as consistent with environment with presence of a wetland ecosystem in a warm and humid climate.

== Cnidarians ==
Name	Novelty	Status	Authors	Age	Type locality	Country	Notes	Images
Aulastraeogyra	Gen. et 2 sp. nov	Valid	Löser & Wilmsen	Late Cretaceous (Cenomanian)	Altamira Formation	Spain	A coral. Genus includes new species A. astraeforma and A. meandriforme.	
Ellisella plana	Sp. nov	Valid	Watling & Sadorf	Eocene	Castle Hayne Formation	United States (North Carolina)	A coral belonging to the family Ellisellidae.	
Ellisella porca	Sp. nov	Valid	Watling & Sadorf	Eocene	Castle Hayne Formation	United States (North Carolina)	A coral belonging to the family Ellisellidae.	
Heina	Gen. et comb. nov	Valid	Wang	Silurian (Aeronian)	Shihniulan Formation	China	A rugose coral belonging to the family Stauriidae. The type species is "Neoceriaster" rarisepta He (1980).	
Hetanihelia	Gen. et sp. et comb. nov	Valid	Raafat et al.	Eocene	Birket Qarun Formation	Egypt	A coral belonging to the family Madreporidae. The type species is H. robusta; genus also includes "Astrohelia" similis Mayer-Eymar (1883).	
Lenipathes	Gen. et sp. nov		Hao, Han, Baliński & Brugler in Hao et al.	Ordovician (Floian)	Fenhsiang Formation	China	A black coral, the type genus of the new family Lenipathidae. Genus includes new species L. infirma.	
Macgeea myallensis	Sp. nov		Wright & McLean	Devonian	Cara Formation	Australia	A rugose coral belonging to the family Phillipsastreidae.	
Michelinia rara	Sp. nov	Valid	Krutykh, Mirantsev & Rozhnov	Carboniferous (Gzhelian)		Russia	A tabulate coral. Published online in 2026, but the issue date is listed as December 2025.	
Moltkia alveolata	Sp. nov	Valid	Watling & Sadorf	Eocene	Castle Hayne Formation	United States (North Carolina)	A coral belonging to the family Coralliidae.	
Multiconularia	Gen. et 3 sp. nov		Song et al.	Cambrian	Yanjiahe Formation	China	A medusozoan of uncertain affinities. The type species is M. sexifacialis; genus also includes M. octofacialis and M. decemfacialis.	
Mycozoon	Gen. et sp. nov	Valid	Zhao, Klug & Cong	Cambrian Stage 3	Yu'anshan Formation	China	An early medusozoan. The type species is M. insolitum.	
Paleocanna	Gen. et sp. nov	Valid	Ramirez-Guerrero et al.	Ordovician	Neuville Formation	Canada (Quebec)	A medusozoan belonging to the stem group of Acraspeda. The type species is P. tentaculum.	
Waiparaconus gravidus	Sp. nov	Valid	Sedorko et al.	Late Cretaceous (Santonian to Campanian)	Gingin Chalk	Australia	A possible sea pen.	
Waiparaconus imbricatus	Sp. nov	Valid	Sedorko et al.	Late Cretaceous (Maastrichtian)	Snow Hill Island Formation	Antarctica	A possible sea pen.	
Yuina	Gen. et comb. nov	Valid	Wang	Silurian (Aeronian)	Leijiatun Formation	China	A rugose coral belonging to the family Stauriidae. The type species is "Ceriaster" columellatus Ge & Yu (1974); genus also includes "Ceriaster (Eostauria)" agglomorata He & Li (1974) and "Ceriaster" qiaogouensis He (1980).	

=== Cnidarian research ===
- Bernad, Echevarría & Ros-Franch (2026) study the diversity dynamics of Conulariida throughout their evolutionary history, reporting evidence of decline of origination rates by the Late Ordovician.
- The oldest post-Ordovician coral reef in South China known to date is reported from the Silurian (Aeronian) strata of the Xiangshuyuan Formation by Yu et al. (2026).
- Wei et al. (2026) compare the diversification dynamics of photosymbiotic and nonphotosymbiotic corals throughout their evolutionary history, and find that photosymbiotic corals did not have a consistent evolutionary advantage over other corals throughout the Phanerozoic.
- Specimens of Montlivaltia with regular growth bands, interpreted as likely evidence of growth periodicities corresponding to lunar cycles nested within annual growth rhythms, are described from the Middle Jurassic strata from Lorraine (France) by Lathuilière (2026).
- Löser (2026) studies the composition of the assemblage of Hauterivian corals from the Yokonuma Formation (Japan), extending known temporal range of the genera Calamophylliopsis, ?Eohydnophora, Siderohelia and Palaeosiderofungia.
- Evidence of rejuvenescence in a Miocene coral Acanthastrea cf. polygonalis from the Band-e-Chakar Formation (Iran), interpreted as possible effect of thermal stress related to the Middle Miocene Climatic Optimum, is presented by Reuter et al. (2026).
- Moclán et al. (2026) study the biometric parameters and orientations of specimens of Cordubia gigantea from the Cambrian strata from the Constantina site (Torreárboles Formation; Spain), identify additional specimens at the studied site, and interpret the specimens from the studied aggregation as likely to have died during a mass mortality event.
- New fossil material of Octapyrgites elongatus, including the first known embryos of the species, is described from the Cambrian strata of the Yanjiahe Formation (Hubei, China) by Peng et al. (2026).
- Moreau et al. (2026) report the discovery of fossil material of Medusina atava from the strata of the Cham-el-Houa Siltstone Formation (Morocco), extending known geographical range of Permian freshwater medusoids into the equatorial zone.

== Brachiopods ==
Name	Novelty	Status	Authors	Age	Type locality	Country	Notes	Images
Altaethyrella xuejiaoi	Sp. nov	Valid	Zhang et al.	Ordovician (Katian)	Yingan Formation	China	A member of Rhynchonellida belonging to the family Ancistrorhynchidae.	
Amphithyris butleri	Sp. nov		Robinson	Eocene		New Zealand	A species of Amphithyris.	
Amphithyris thomsoni	Sp. nov		Robinson	Eocene to Oligocene		New Zealand	A species of Amphithyris.	
Angustothyris aszofoensis	Sp. nov	Valid	Guo et al.	Middle Triassic (Anisian)	Felsőörs Formation	Hungary		
Balatonithyris	Gen. et comb. nov	Valid	Guo et al.	Middle Triassic (Anisian)	Felsőörs Formation	Hungary	Genus includes "Waldheimia" angustaeformis Böckh (1872).	
Biconvexiella raqueliae	Sp. nov	Valid	Robles Vilches, Taboada & Pagani			Argentina		
Brachiocyrtina	Gen. et 2 sp. nov	Valid	García-Alcalde	Devonian		Spain	A member of the family Cyrtinidae. The type species is B. fontebaixana; genus also includes B. offenbachi.	
Chonostrophia raquelae	Sp. nov	Valid	Videira-Santos & Scheffler	Devonian (Pragian–Emsian)	Ponta Grossa Formation	Brazil	A member of Productida belonging to the family Chonostrophiidae.	
Crurithyris salinensis	Sp. nov	Valid	Robles Vilches, Taboada & Pagani			Argentina		
Dictyonina tetralobata	Sp. nov		Lavié et al.	Cambrian Stage 10	Lampazar Formation	Argentina		
Dubatolovispirifer	Gen. et sp. nov	Valid	Baranov & Nikolaev	Devonian (Pragian)		Russia	A member of Spiriferida. The type species is D. ribbed. Published online in 2026, but the issue date is listed as December 2025.	
Eoscaphelasma santaolallai	Sp. nov		Lavié et al.	Cambrian Stage 10	Lampazar Formation	Argentina		
Fulcriphoria petericarlsi	Sp. nov	Valid	Jansen	Devonian	Taunusquarzit Group	Germany	A member of Orthida belonging to the family Proschizophoriidae.	
Glosshypothyridina theophili	Sp. nov	Valid	Halamski, Baliński & Racki	Devonian	Laskowa Góra Beds	Poland		
Golestania	Gen. et sp. nov	Valid	Baranov, Kebrie-ee Zade & Blodgett	Devonian (Famennian)	Khoshyeilagh Formation	Iran	A member of Spiriferida belonging to the family Ambocoelidae. The type species is G. shahrudus. Published online in 2026, but the issue date is listed as December 2025.	
Howellella nelyudimica	Sp. nov	Valid	Baranov & Nikolaev	Devonian (Pragian)		Russia	A member of Spiriferida. Published online in 2026, but the issue date is listed as December 2025.	
Howellella septentrionalis	Sp. nov	Valid	Baranov & Nikolaev	Devonian (Pragian)		Russia	A member of Spiriferida. Published online in 2026, but the issue date is listed as December 2025.	
Isocrania multicostata	Sp. nov		Poddar et al.	Late Cretaceous (Maastrichtian)	Kallankurichchi Formation	India		
Jilinmartinia hovsugolensis	Sp. nov	Valid	Sun et al.	Permian (Cisuralian)	Kharnuden Formation	Mongolia		
Johndearia isbelli dorsofurcata	Ssp. nov	Valid	Waterhouse	Permian		Australia	A member of the family Ingelarellidae.	
Kallirhynchia oranensis roussellei	Ssp. nov		Benzaggagh	Middle Jurassic (Bathonian)		Morocco		
Kosoplasia	Gen. et comb. nov		Mergl	Silurian (Ludfordian)		Czech Republic	A member of the family Ambocoeliidae. Genus includes "Metaplasia" hemicona Havlíček in Havlíček & Štorch (1990).	
Kyrshabaktella yantaiensis	Sp. nov		Wei et al.	Cambrian Stage 4	Tsinghsutung Formation	China	A member of Lingulida belonging to the family Kyrshabaktellidae.	
Kyrtatrypa stanislai	Sp. nov	Valid	Halamski, Baliński & Racki	Devonian	Laskowa Góra Beds	Poland		
Lambdarina vangyrika	Sp. nov	Valid	Pakhnevich & Sobolev	Carboniferous (Tournaisian)		Russia (Komi Republic)	A member of Rhynchonellida belonging to the superfamily Lambdarinoidea. Published online in 2026, but the issue date is listed as December 2025.	
Linoproductus planiconvexus	Sp. nov	Valid	Sun et al.	Permian (Cisuralian)	Kharnuden Formation	Mongolia		
Mosaproductus	Gen. et comb. et sp. nov		Carniti et al.	Carboniferous	Visé Formation	Belgium; United Kingdom	A member of Productidina. The type species is M. arcuarius (de Koninck, 1843); genus also includes new species M. cocksi.	
Oaxaquiatreta argentina	Sp. nov		Lavié et al.	Cambrian Stage 10	Lampazar Formation	Argentina		
Orbiculoidea matogrossensis	Sp. nov		Ribeiro et al.	Devonian	Ponta Grossa Formation	Brazil	A member of Lingulata belonging to the family Discinidae.	
Orbirhynchia yebenesi	Sp. nov		Baeza-Carratalá et al.	Early Cretaceous		Spain	A member of the family Basiliolidae.	
Ovatia burrowi	Sp. nov		Carniti et al.	Carboniferous		United Kingdom	A member of Productidina.	
Ovatia tubiformis	Sp. nov		Carniti et al.	Carboniferous		United Kingdom	A member of Productidina.	
Paramarginifera pentagona	Sp. nov	Valid	Sun et al.	Permian (Cisuralian)	Kharnuden Formation	Mongolia		
Pocillocrania	Gen. et sp. nov		Madison et al.	Ordovician (Hirnantian)		Estonia	A craniiform brachiopod belonging to the family Craniidae. The type species is P. rubeli.	
Praeoehlertella convexa	Sp. nov		Valentine, Mathieson & Simpson	Devonian		Australia	A discinoid brachiopod.	
Qianothyris	Gen. et comb. nov	Valid	Guo et al.	Middle Triassic (Anisian)	Qingyan Formation	China	Genus includes "Angustothyris" qingyanensis Guo, Chen & Harper (2019).	
Septothyris sulcata	Sp. nov	Valid	Benedetto, Rustan & Lopez	Devonian (Lochkovian)	Los Espejos Formation	Argentina	A member of Terebratulida.	
Severginaria	Nom. nov	Valid	Zhen	Ordovician		Mongolia; Russia	A replacement name for Salairella Severgina (1984).	
Spinuliplica guangrongshi	Sp. nov	Valid	Robles Vilches, Taboada & Pagani			Argentina		
Spirelytha trilagoonensis	Sp. nov	Valid	Robles Vilches, Taboada & Pagani			Argentina		
Tritoechia cheongpungensis	Sp. nov		Oh et al.	Ordovician		South Korea		
Urbicrania	Gen. et 2 sp. nov	Valid	Mergl & Sazimová	Silurian and Devonian	Praha Formation	Czech Republic	A member of Craniida. The type species is U. limbata; genus also includes U. egressa.	

=== Brachiopod research ===
- Vermeij (2026) studies the evolution of functionally important traits in brachiopods and bivalves, interprets the bivalve morphology as providing them with a broader range of adaptive possibilities compared to brachiopods, and argues that the proliferation of bivalves was linked to changes of environmental conditions after Paleozoic to ones that bivalves were better suited to accommodate compared to brachiopods.
- Esteve, González-Cloquells & Arriola (2026) compare the columnar microstructure of Iberotreta sampelayoi and Genetreta trilix from the Láncara Formation (Spain), providing evidence of differences interpreted as related to distinct biomechanical characteristics, and link the diversification of Cambrian brachiopods to the variation of their skeletal architecture.
- A study on the diversification patterns of members of the genera Hesperorthis, Mimella and Oepikina across the Great Ordovician Biodiversification Event is published by Stigall, Wright & Censullo (2026).
- A study on the composition of the brachiopod assemblage from the Ordovician Cabrières Biota (Landeyran Formation, France) is published by Harper et al. (2026).
- Zhang et al. (2026) publish a revision of the species "Salairella" latecostellata and a systematic revision of the genus "Salairella", providing evidence of distinctiveness of late Ordovician brachiopods assemblages from the Altai Mountains, Siberia and Mongolia compared to the ones from China and Kazakhstan.
- A new brachiopod assemblage, providing evidence of recovery of brachiopod communities in the aftermath of the Late Ordovician mass extinction, is described from the Wulipo Bed (Guizhou, China) by Shi et al. (2026).
- Huang et al. (2026) study changes of composition of Telychian brachiopod assemblages from the Ningqiang Formation (Sichuan, China), providing evidence of a shift from a deep-water fauna to one from shallower environment, interpreted as a response to regional uplift.
- Naamdhew, Penn-Clarke & Harper (2026) reconstruct changes of composition of Devonian brachiopod communities from Gondwana and their biogeography, finding evidence of reduced faunal exchange to high-latitude parts of Gondwana compared to assemblages from lower latitudes.
- Qiao, Gorgij & Shen (2026) study the composition and biogeographic affinities of Devonian brachiopod faunas from the Tabas area (Iran), reporting evidence of affinities with other peri-Gondwanan faunas and evidence of separation from the Euramerican realm.
- A study on changes of diversity and distribution of Productida throughout the evolutionary history of the group is published by Chen et al. (2026).
- Fu et al. (2026) describe fossil material of Pseudolingula quadrata from the Ordovician Pingliang Formation (China), preserved with impressions of the musculature and the vascular system, and representing the first record of Pseudolingulidae from the North China Platform.
- Popov et al. (2026) report the discovery of a specimen of Mergliella aff. bechei from the Ludfordian Cae'r mynach Formation (Wales, United Kingdom) with a well-preserved pedicle, representing the first case of soft tissue preservation in a Silurian linguliform brachiopod.
- Müller et al. (2026) report a mass occurrence of specimens of Halorella amphitoma in the Upper Triassic strata of the Dachstein Formation (Hungary), interpreted as preserved in a palaeokarst cavity filled by seawater as a result of sea-level rise, and expanding known range of habitats of the studied species.
- Halamski & Baliński (2026) identify Cadomella quenstedti as a junior synonym of Cadomella moorei, and reevaluate the nomenclature and distribution of the genus Cadomella.
- New records of fossils of brachiopods from the orders Athyridida, Rhynchonellida and Spiriferinida from the Triassic and Jurassic strata in New Zealand and New Caledonia are reported by MacFarlan (2026).
- Surlyk & Schrøder (2026) study the composition of the Maastrichtian brachiopod assemblages from the Hemmoor Formation (Germany), interpreted as three ecological assemblages from different water depth and reflecting different availability of substrates.
- The latest Mesozoic brachiopod assemblage reported to date is described from the Maastrichtian strata of the Møns Klint Formation (Denmark) by Surlyk, Jakobsen & Hofstedt (2026).
- Bitner & Bakayeva (2026) report rediscovery of the middle Miocene brachiopod assemblage from western Ukraine originally described by Wilhelm Friedberg in 1921, and provide a taxonomic revision of this assemblage.

== Bryozoans ==
Name	Novelty	Status	Authors	Age	Type locality	Country	Notes	Images
Amphiblestrella magna	Sp. nov	Valid	Koromyslova & Martha	Paleocene (Thanetian)		Kazakhstan	A member of the family Onychocellidae.	
Bactropora aequalis	Sp. nov	Valid	Ernst	Devonian (Lochkovian)	Birdsong Shale	United States (Tennessee)	A cryptostome bryozoan.	
Bactropora parva	Sp. nov	Valid	Ernst	Devonian (Lochkovian)	Birdsong Shale	United States (Tennessee)	A cryptostome bryozoan.	
Brydonella favorskayae	Sp. nov	Valid	Koromyslova & Martha	Paleocene (Thanetian)		Kazakhstan	A member of Flustrina belonging to the family Brydonellidae.	
Cellaria comodorensis	Sp. nov	Valid	Iturra, López-Gappa & Pérez in Iturra et al.	Miocene	Chenque Formation	Argentina	A species of Cellaria.	
Cellaria fallax	Sp. nov	Valid	Iturra, López-Gappa & Pérez in Iturra et al.	Oligocene	San Julián Formation	Argentina	A species of Cellaria.	
Cellaria roborata	Sp. nov	Valid	Iturra, López-Gappa & Pérez in Iturra et al.	Miocene	Gaiman Formation	Argentina	A species of Cellaria.	
Dayingomelission	Gen. et sp. nov	Valid	Song, Zhang & Ernst in Song et al.	Cambrian Stage 3	Xiannüdong Formation	China	An early member of Stenolaemata. The type species is D. hexaclitia.	
Distansescharella levinae	Sp. nov	Valid	Koromyslova & Martha	Paleocene (Thanetian)		Kazakhstan	A member of the family Cribrilinidae.	
Gramipora	Gen. et sp. nov	Valid	Håkansson et al.	Miocene	Gram Formation	Denmark	A cheilostome bryozoan of uncertain affinities. The type species is G. laxevincta.	
Hagemanella	Gen. et comb. nov	Valid	Ernst	Devonian		United States	A cryptostome bryozoan. Genus includes H. granatula (Hall & Simpson, 1887)	
Hexacanthopora turgayensis	Sp. nov	Valid	Koromyslova & Martha	Paleocene (Thanetian)		Kazakhstan	A member of the family Cribrilinidae.	
Juanopora	Gen. et sp. nov	Valid	Ernst, Racki & Wyse Jackson	Devonian (Givetian)	Wietrznia Beds	Poland	A member of the family Fenestellidae. The type species is J. elegans.	
Lepidotrypa	Gen. et comb. nov	Valid	Ernst	Devonian		United States	A cryptostome bryozoan. Genus includes L. rhomboidea (Hall, 1881)	
Reussirella germinatio	Sp. nov	Valid	Håkansson et al.	Miocene	Gram Formation	Denmark	A cheilostome bryozoan belonging to the family Cupuladriidae.	
Voigtopora naidini	Sp. nov	Valid	Koromyslova & Martha	Paleocene (Thanetian)		Kazakhstan	A member of the family Stomatoporidae.	

=== Bryozoan research ===
- Song et al. (2026) report the discovery of new fossil material of Protomelission gatehousei from the Cambrian Xiannüdong Formation (China), and interpret its anatomy as supporting its classification as an early bryozoan.

== Echinoderms ==
Name	Novelty	Status	Authors	Age	Type locality	Country	Notes	Images
Acruxaster	Gen. et comb. nov	Valid	Jell	Silurian and Devonian		Australia	A new genus for "Petraster" richi Withers & Keble.	
Afanasievocrinus	Gen. et sp. nov	Valid	Mirantsev	Carboniferous (Kasimovian)	Neverovo Formation	Russia	A crinoid. Genus includes new species A. pentagonalis. Published online in 2026, but the issue date is listed as November 2025.	
Allosocrinus moscoviensis	Sp. nov	Valid	Mirantsev	Carboniferous (Kasimovian)	Neverovo Formation	Russia	A crinoid. Published online in 2026, but the issue date is listed as November 2025.	
Apographiocrinus convexus	Sp. nov	Valid	Mirantsev	Carboniferous (Kasimovian)	Neverovo Formation	Russia	A crinoid. Published online in 2026, but the issue date is listed as November 2025.	
Arbacia percaribbeana	Sp. nov	Valid	Courville et al.	Pliocene and Pleistocene	Tamiami Formation	Curaçao; Trinidad and Tobago; United States (Florida); Venezuela	A sea urchin.	
Atlaseocrinus	Gen. et sp. et comb. nov	Valid	Dupichaud et al.	Cambrian	Issafen Formation	Morocco; Spain	A member of Eocrinoidea belonging to the group Gogiida. The type species is A. issafenensis; genus also includes "Rhopalocystis" mesonesensis Clausen (2004).	
Aubecrinus	Gen. et comb. nov	Valid	Gale	Late Cretaceous (Turonian to Campanian)		Czech Republic; France; Germany; Netherlands; United Kingdom	A crinoid belonging to the family Bourgueticrinidae. The type species is "Antedon" fischeri Geinitz (1872); genus also includes "Volvola" hureae Valette (1917) and possibly "Bourgueticrinus" elegans Griffith & Brydone (1911).	
Austrophiaulax	Gen. et comb. nov	Valid	Jell	Devonian		Australia	A new genus for "Crepidosoma" kinglakensis Withers & Keble.	
Batainacrinus	Gen. et sp. nov	Valid	Webster, Ausich & Heward	Permian (Kungurian)	Batain Group	Oman	A crinoid belonging to the family Sycocrinitidae. The type species is B. sulcus.	
Brabeocrinus costatus	Sp. nov	Valid	Mirantsev	Carboniferous (Kasimovian)	Neverovo Formation	Russia	A crinoid. Published online in 2026, but the issue date is listed as November 2025.	
Bromidocycloides	Gen. et sp. nov	Valid	Kolata, Guensburg & Mooi	Ordovician (Katian)	Bromide Formation	United States (Oklahoma)	A member of Cyclocystoidea. The type species is B. sprinklei.	
Carstenicrinus minimus	Sp. nov	Valid	Gale	Late Cretaceous (Campanian)		United Kingdom	A crinoid belonging to the family Rhizocrinidae.	
Carstenicrinus praecursor	Sp. nov	Valid	Gale	Late Cretaceous (Turonian)		France	A crinoid belonging to the family Rhizocrinidae.	
Catinogalerus	Gen. et sp. nov	Valid	Neumann & Kutscher	Late Cretaceous (Campanian)		Germany	A sea urchin belonging to the family Galeritidae. The type species is C. alexanderi.	
Cemgiganticrinus	Gen. et sp. nov	Valid	Mirantsev	Carboniferous (Kasimovian)	Neverovo Formation	Russia	A crinoid. Genus includes new species C. popovorum. Published online in 2026, but the issue date is listed as November 2025.	
?Chlidonocrinus medvedkaensis	Sp. nov	Valid	Mirantsev	Carboniferous (Kasimovian)	Neverovo Formation	Russia	A crinoid. Published online in 2026, but the issue date is listed as November 2025.	
Chrispaulia australis	Sp. nov	Valid	Gale & McNamara	Late Cretaceous (Campanian)		Australia	A goniopectinid starfish.	
Coenocystis akros	Sp. nov	Valid	Webster, Ausich & Heward	Permian (Kungurian)	Batain Group	Oman	A crinoid belonging to the family Streblocrinidae.	
Cretacaudina	Gen. et sp. nov	Valid	Reich, Kutscher & Stegemann	Late Cretaceous (Maastrichtian)	Rügen Chalk	Germany	A caudinid sea cucumber. The type species is C. rugia.	
Cruciformaster	Gen. et sp. nov	Valid	Travers & Fau in Travers et al.	Miocene	Calcaire de Ménerbes Formation	France	A starfish belonging to the family Oreasteridae. The type species is C. pedicellarius.	
Cryptoblastus canadensis	Sp. nov	Valid	Macurda & Sprinkle	Carboniferous		Canada	A blastoid.	
Curtobesaster	Gen. et sp. nov	Valid	Jell	Devonian		Australia	A starfish. Genus includes new species C. brachiatus.	
Cyclaster pectiformis	Sp. nov	Valid	Neumann & Jagt	Late Cretaceous (Campanian)		Germany	A sea urchin belonging to the family Micrasteridae.	
Degeneraster	Gen. et sp. nov	Valid	Blake & Lefebvre	Ordovician (Katian)		Morocco	A starfish. Genus includes new species D. spenceri.	
Diabolocrinus? victoriae	Sp. nov		Hoare, Donovan & Stewart	Ordovician	Ardwell Farm Formation	United Kingdom	A diplobathrid crinoid.	
Dichostreblocrinus aequalis	Sp. nov	Valid	Webster, Ausich & Heward	Permian (Kungurian)	Batain Group	Oman	A crinoid belonging to the family Streblocrinidae.	
Eckardtaster	Gen. et sp. nov	Valid	Jell	Devonian		Australia	A brittle star. Genus includes new species E. superbus.	
Eifelocrinus baztani	Sp. nov	Valid	Zamora & Ausich	Devonian		Spain	A crinoid belonging to the family Mastigocrinidae.	
Elibatocrinus gracilis	Sp. nov	Valid	Mirantsev	Carboniferous (Kasimovian)	Neverovo Formation	Russia	A crinoid. Published online in 2026, but the issue date is listed as November 2025.	
Enakosphalma	Gen. et sp. nov	Valid	Ishida et al.	Late Cretaceous (Maastrichtian)	Futakawa Formation	Japan	A brittle star belonging to the family Ophiosphalmidae. The type species is E. nagashimai.	
Enidaster	Gen. et sp. nov	Valid	Jell	Devonian		Australia	A brittle star. Genus includes new species E. holmesae.	
Eucystis charlotteae	Sp. nov	Valid	Hill et al.	Silurian	Moccasin Springs Formation	United States (Missouri)	A blastozoan belonging to the group Diploporita and the family Holocystitidae.	
Eugasterella australiana	Sp. nov	Valid	Jell	Devonian		Australia	A brittle star.	
Eugasterella edmundgilli	Sp. nov	Valid	Jell	Devonian		Australia	A brittle star.	
Exoriocrinus pseudorugosus	Sp. nov	Valid	Mirantsev	Carboniferous (Kasimovian)	Neverovo Formation	Russia	A crinoid. Published online in 2026, but the issue date is listed as November 2025.	
Faorina mizoramensis	Sp. nov	Valid	Hsu & Lin in Hsu et al.	Miocene	Bhuban Formation	India	A heart urchin belonging to the family Pericosmidae.	
Ferroaster	Gen. et sp. nov	Valid	Jell	Devonian		Australia	A starfish. Genus includes new species F. gravidus.	
Fhcaster	Gen. et sp. nov	Valid	Jell	Devonian		Australia	A brittle star. Genus includes new species F. hotchkissi.	
Fonsaster	Gen. et sp. nov	Valid	Jell	Devonian		Australia	A starfish. Genus includes new species F. vandenbergi.	
Furcaster chrisahyeei	Sp. nov	Valid	Jell	Devonian		Australia	A brittle star.	
Gastrocrinus canteri	Sp. nov	Valid	Zamora & Ausich	Devonian		Spain	A crinoid belonging to the family Botryocrinidae.	
Gennaeocrinus wenningi	Sp. nov	Valid	Bohatý, Ausich & Bialas	Devonian (Famennian)	Etroeungt Formation	Germany	A periechocrinid crinoid.	
Globoblastus bamberi	Sp. nov	Valid	Macurda & Sprinkle	Carboniferous		Canada	A blastoid.	
Gracilicrinus	Gen. et sp. nov	Valid	Mirantsev	Carboniferous (Kasimovian)	Neverovo Formation	Russia	A crinoid. Genus includes new species G. chertanovoensis. Published online in 2026, but the issue date is listed as November 2025.	
Guensburgocrinus	Gen. et sp. nov	Valid	Lewis & Sprinkle	Ordovician	Oil Creek Formation	United States (Oklahoma)	A hybocrinid crinoid. Genus includes new species G. lineatus.	
Halogetocrinus yakovlevi	Sp. nov	Valid	Mirantsev	Carboniferous (Kasimovian)	Neverovo Formation	Russia	A crinoid. Published online in 2026, but the issue date is listed as November 2025.	
Hemistreptacron concavus	Sp. nov	Valid	Webster, Ausich & Heward	Permian (Kungurian)	Batain Group	Oman	A crinoid belonging to the family Streblocrinidae.	
?Hybocrinus nanobrachiatus	Sp. nov	Valid	Lewis & Sprinkle	Ordovician	Oil Creek Formation	United States (Oklahoma)	A hybocrinid crinoid.	
Jenoaster	Gen. et sp. nov		Salamon et al.	Early Cretaceous (Aptian)	Bulldog Shale	Australia	A starfish belonging to the family Zoroasteridae. Genus includes new species J. cooberpediensis.	
Kswaster	Gen. et sp. nov	Valid	Jell	Devonian		Australia	A starfish. Genus includes new species K. campbelli.	
Lapworthura nnetteae	Sp. nov	Valid	Jell	Devonian		Australia	A brittle star.	
Lavacystis	Gen. et sp. nov	Valid	Rozhnov	Ordovician (Floian)		Russia (Leningrad Oblast)	A member of Rhombifera belonging to the family Pleurocystitidae. Genus includes new species L. sagittalis. Published online in 2026, but the issue date is listed as December 2025.	
Litocrinus delicatulus	Sp. nov	Valid	Webster, Ausich & Heward	Permian (Kungurian)	Batain Group	Oman	A crinoid belonging to the family Allagecrinidae.	
Litocrinus lanei	Sp. nov	Valid	Webster, Ausich & Heward	Permian (Kungurian)	Batain Group	Oman	A crinoid belonging to the family Allagecrinidae.	
Litocrinus ornatus	Sp. nov	Valid	Webster, Ausich & Heward	Permian (Kungurian)	Batain Group	Oman	A crinoid belonging to the family Allagecrinidae.	
Litocrinus sevastopuloi	Sp. nov	Valid	Webster, Ausich & Heward	Permian (Kungurian)	Batain Group	Oman	A crinoid belonging to the family Allagecrinidae.	
Menerbesaster	Gen. et sp. nov	Valid	Travers & Fau in Travers et al.	Miocene	Calcaire de Ménerbes Formation	France	A starfish belonging to the family Echinasteridae. The type species is M. bongrainae.	
Metallagecrinus blothros	Sp. nov	Valid	Webster, Ausich & Heward	Permian (Kungurian)	Batain Group	Oman	A crinoid belonging to the family Allagecrinidae.	
Metallagecrinus granulosus	Sp. nov	Valid	Webster, Ausich & Heward	Permian (Kungurian)	Batain Group	Oman	A crinoid belonging to the family Allagecrinidae.	
Metallagecrinus omanensis	Sp. nov	Valid	Webster, Ausich & Heward	Permian (Kungurian)	Batain Group	Oman	A crinoid belonging to the family Allagecrinidae.	
Metopaster boudinus	Sp. nov	Valid	Villier et al.	Late Cretaceous		France	A starfish.	
Metopaster boutillieri	Sp. nov	Valid	Villier et al.	Late Cretaceous		France	A starfish.	
Metopaster brebis	Sp. nov	Valid	Villier et al.	Late Cretaceous		France	A starfish.	
Metopaster fa	Sp. nov	Valid	Villier et al.	Late Cretaceous		France	A starfish.	
Metopaster glarea	Sp. nov	Valid	Villier et al.	Late Cretaceous		France	A starfish.	
Metopaster sandalina	Sp. nov	Valid	Villier et al.	Late Cretaceous		France	A starfish.	
Michelicrinus	Gen. et sp. nov	Valid	Gale	Late Cretaceous (Turonian to Campanian)		France; United Kingdom	A crinoid belonging to the family Rhizocrinidae. The type species is M. crenellatus.	
Migmacrinus	Gen. et 2 sp. nov		Guensburg et al.	Ordovician		France; United States (Utah; Idaho?)	An early crinoid. Genus includes M. koilos and M. kunduraorum.	
Mitrocystella incipiens pustulosa	Ssp. nov	Valid	Vidal-Marty et al.	Ordovician (Darriwilian)	Guindo Shale	Spain	A mitrate belonging to the family Mitrocystitidae.	
Monobrachiocrinus trochos	Sp. nov	Valid	Webster, Ausich & Heward	Permian (Kungurian)	Batain Group	Oman	A crinoid belonging to the family Sycocrinitidae.	
Neverovocrinus	Gen. et sp. nov	Valid	Mirantsev	Carboniferous (Kasimovian)	Neverovo Formation	Russia	A crinoid. Genus includes new species N. decadoramosus. Published online in 2026, but the issue date is listed as November 2025.	
Ophiura huebnerjenseni	Sp. nov	Valid	Thuy et al.	Miocene (Tortonian)	Gram Formation	Denmark	A brittle star.	
Ophiurina ripariensis	Sp. nov	Valid	Jell	Devonian		Australia	A brittle star.	
Patenaster	Gen. et 2 sp. nov	Valid	Jell	Devonian		Australia	A brittle star. Genus includes new species P. knoxensis and P. secundus.	
Pentremites jasperensis	Sp. nov	Valid	Macurda & Sprinkle	Carboniferous		Canada	A blastoid.	
Phurioina	Gen. et comb. et sp. nov	Valid	Jell	Devonian		Australia	A brittle star. A new genus for "Taeniactis" yeringae Withers & Keble; genus also includes new species P. lilydalensis.	
Pseudogibbaster herkstroeteri	Sp. nov	Valid	Neumann	Paleocene (Danian)		Denmark	A heart urchin belonging to the family Micrasteridae.	
Quarreriaster	Gen. et sp. nov	Valid	Jell	Devonian		Australia	A starfish. Genus includes new species Q. madelynae.	
Quebecocystites	Gen. et comb. nov	Valid	Deline et al.	Ordovician		Canada (Quebec)	A paracrinoid; a new genus for "Amygdalocystites" gorgo Sinclair (1948).	
Reteocrinus oklahomensis	Sp. nov	Valid	Lewis & Sprinkle	Ordovician	Oil Creek Formation	United States (Oklahoma)	A camerate crinoid.	
Rolfaster	Gen. et sp. nov	Valid	Jell	Devonian		Australia	A brittle star. Genus includes new species R. schmidti.	
Strongyloblastus recurvatus	Sp. nov	Valid	Macurda & Sprinkle	Carboniferous		Canada	A blastoid.	
Subcystaster	Gen. et sp. nov	Valid	Jell	Devonian		Australia	An asterozoan belonging to the group Stenurida. Genus includes new species S. magnadamus.	
Sukhanovocrinus	Gen. et sp. nov	Valid	Mirantsev	Carboniferous (Kasimovian)	Neverovo Formation	Russia	A crinoid. Genus includes new species S. parvus. Published online in 2026, but the issue date is listed as November 2025.	
Sulcatocrinus	Gen. et sp. nov	Valid	Mirantsev	Carboniferous (Kasimovian)	Neverovo Formation	Russia	A crinoid. Genus includes new species S. sinusoides. Published online in 2026, but the issue date is listed as November 2025.	
Syzigobrachiocrinus	Gen. et sp. nov	Valid	Mirantsev	Carboniferous (Kasimovian)	Neverovo Formation	Russia	A crinoid. Genus includes new species S. ramulosus. Published online in 2026, but the issue date is listed as November 2025.	
Talentaster	Gen. et comb. nov	Valid	Jell	Silurian and Devonian		Australia	A new genus for "Salteraster" biradialis Withers & Keble.	
Tanyakanthaster	Gen. et sp. nov	Valid	Jell	Devonian		Australia	An asterozoan belonging to the group Stenurida. Genus includes new species T. plerus.	
Tenuibrachiocrinus	Gen. et 2 sp. nov	Valid	Mirantsev	Carboniferous (Kasimovian)	Neverovo Formation	Russia	A crinoid. Genus includes new species T. domodedovoensis and T. erlangeri. Published online in 2026, but the issue date is listed as November 2025.	
Tholoblastus	Gen. et sp. nov	Valid	Macurda & Sprinkle	Carboniferous		Canada	A blastoid. Genus includes new species T. raaschi.	
Tomidaster timothyi	Sp. nov	Valid	Gale & McNamara	Late Cretaceous (Santonian)		Australia	A goniasterid starfish.	
Voskresenskicrinus	Gen. et sp. nov	Valid	Mirantsev	Carboniferous (Kasimovian)	Neverovo Formation	Russia	A crinoid. Genus includes new species V. medvedkensis. Published online in 2026, but the issue date is listed as November 2025.	
Xenaster profusus	Sp. nov	Valid	Jell	Devonian		Australia	A starfish.	

=== Echinoderm research ===
- Paul & Mao (2026) report evidence of similarities of early Paleozoic echinoderms from China to forms known from other parts of the globe, indicating that disproportionate representation of North American and European fossils in the known echinoderm fossil record did not result in a confirmed distortion of known diversity and evolutionary history of the group, and report evidence of a sharp rise of the rate of discovery of new Chinese fossil echinoderms.
- Nohejlová, Dupichaud & Lefebvre (2026) report the discovery of fossil material of Dehmicystis aff. ariasi from the strata of the Nantglyn Flags Formation (Wales, United Kingdom), representing the second record of Silurian Soluta worldwide reported to date.
- Sheffield et al. (2026) compare rates of evolution of traits of members of Diploporita, Eublastoidea and Paracrinoidea and study their phylogenetic relationships, reporting evidence of overall similar rates among the three groups, but also evidence of elevated rates of evolution of the attachment, thecal, reproductive and respiratory characters in paracrinoids.
- Paul (2026) revises the ambulacral structure of members of accepted genera within the diploporite family Gomphocystitidae, and tentatively assigns the species "Protocrinus" sparsiporus from the Ordovician of Myanmar to the genus Gomphocystites.
- Taxonomic revision of the aristocystitid diploporite genus Calix is published by Makhlouf et al. (2026).
- Waters & Macurda (2026) reevaluate the affinities of blastoids and propose a new classification of members of the group, reorganizing them into three superorders on the basis of differences in their respiratory structures.
- The oldest known crinoid specimen comparable in size and developmental stage to an early pentacrinoid larva of living crinoids is described from the Ordovician (Katian) Verulam Formation (Ontario, Canada) by Ausich, Hetrick & Leslie (2026).
- The oldest evidence of crinoid tube feet preservation known to date is reported in specimens of Dendrocrinus simcoensis from the Ordovician (Katian) Neuville Formation (Trenton Group; Quebec, Canada) by Cole et al. (2026).
- Crowley & Wright (2026) study the phylogenetic relationships and evolutionary history of Ordovician and Silurian members of Flexibilia, reporting evidence of origin of the group in central Laurentia.
- Accumulation of crinoid fossils representing the first confirmed crinoid Konzentrat-Lagerstätte from the Middle Jurassic of Africa reported to date, dominated by Phyllocrinus stellaris, is described from the Bathonian strata of the Djara Formation (Algeria) by Salamon et al. (2026).
- Salamon et al. (2026) describe new cyrtocrinid crinoid fossil material from the Jurassic (Callovian and Oxfordian) strata of the Argiles de Saïda Formation (Algeria), including fossils of members of the genera Apsidocrinus and Tetracrinus older than the oldest reported European occurrences, and review the fossil record of cyrtocrinids from Gondwana, interpreted as indicative of diversification of members of this group in areas other than the European part of the Tethys Ocean, as well as indicative of complex dispersal patterns along northern and southern Tethyan margins.
- New information on the internal structures of Sergipecrinus reticulatus, including the first record of presence of sub-basal balls in the cup of members of this species (previously reported in other roveacrinids), is provided by Poatskievick-Pierezan et al. (2026).
- Poatskievick-Pierezan et al. (2026) report the first discovery of confirmed stalked crinoid remains from the Maastrichtian López de Bertodano Formation, providing evidence of presence of stalked crinoids in predator-dominated continental shelf ecosystems of Antarctica until the latest Cretaceous, filling the gap between Antarctic crinoid fossil record from the Early Cretaceous and from the Paleogene.
- Salamon et al. (2026) report the discovery of fossil material of stalked crinoids living in a nearshore setting from the Eocene Popiele Beds (Poland), interpreted as possible evidence of local persistence of shallow-water refugia for stalked crinoids after the ecological restructuring associated with the Mesozoic marine revolution.
- A study on the taxonomic composition and ecology of the assemblage of Late Cretaceous (Turonian) sea urchins from the UNESCO Global Geopark Costa Quebrada and adjacent areas west of Santander (Spain) is published by Schlüter, Wiese & Díaz Isa (2026).
- Hsu et al. (2026) describe new fossil material of Brissopsis luzonica from the Pliocene and Pleistocene strata from Taiwan and the Philippines, and report evidence of overall stability of morphology of petaloid respiratory structures throughout the evolutionary history of the genus Brissopsis.
- Stöhr, Jagt & Thuy (2026) report the discovery of fossil material of "Ophiolepis" falsa from the Upper Cretaceous (Campanian) strata in the Münsterland Basin (Germany), and transfer this species to the extant brittle star genus Actinozonella.
- New information on the anatomy of Astrosombra rammsteinensis is provided by Thuy et al. (2026).

== Hemichordates ==
Name	Novelty	Status	Authors	Age	Type locality	Country	Notes	Images
Saetograptus rinconadensis	Sp. nov	Valid	Lopez et al.	Silurian	Rinconada Formation	Argentina	A graptolite belonging to the family Monograptidae.	
Sigmagraptus introversus	Sp. nov	Valid	Maletz	Ordovician (Dapingian)	Cow Head Group	Canada (Newfoundland and Labrador); Norway	A graptolite belonging to the family Sigmagraptidae.	
Sigmagraptus sombrero	Sp. nov	Valid	Maletz	Ordovician (Dapingian)	Cow Head Group	Canada (Newfoundland and Labrador)	A graptolite belonging to the family Sigmagraptidae.	

=== Hemichordate research ===
- Review of research from the preceding years on the diversity of graptolites throughout their evolutionary history is published by Maletz (2026).
- A study on the composition of the graptolite assemblage from the Ordovician Cabrières Biota (France) is published by Harper et al. (2026).
- Fossil material of Acanthograptus sp. and Dendrograptus sp., providing new information on the anatomy of callograptid graptolites, is described from a glacial erratic boulder of Ordovician (Sandbian) age from Germany by Maletz & Klafack (2026).
- Qiu et al. (2026) link the decline of graptolites belonging to the group Diplograptina during the Late Ordovician mass extinction and subsequent diversification of Neograptina to dynamic marine euxinia and enhanced sedimentary phosphorus recycling during the Ordovician-Silurian transition.
- Saparin et al. (2026) study the composition of the graptolite assemblages from the Ordovician-Silurian strata of the Wang Tong Formation (Thailand), and reconstruct the graptolite biostratigraphy of the studied strata.
- Kozłowska, Melchin & Lenz (2026) provide new information on the anatomy and growth of retiolitine graptolites on the basis of the study of specimens of Spinograptus praerobustus and Cometograptus apsis from the Silurian (Wenlock) strata from the Cornwallis Island (Nunavut, Canada).
- A study on the morphology of members the graptolite genus Pseudoretiolites, on the composition of the genus and on the evolution of this lineage is published by Maletz et al. (2026).
- Crampton et al. (2026) reconstruct extinction dynamics throughout the evolutionary history of graptoloids, and find that the majority of graptoloid extinctions happened outside periods of significant extinction events, which were distinguished from time intervals of background extinction mainly by more frequent and prolonged pulses of high extinction rate.

== Conodonts ==
Name	Novelty	Status	Authors	Age	Type locality	Country	Notes	Images
Icriodella serpaglii	Sp. nov	Valid	Ferretti, Cioni & Gibellini	Ordovician		Italy		
Kirkupodus extentus	Sp. nov		Zhen	Ordovician		Australia	A member of Protopanderodontida.	
Kirkupodus gracilentus	Sp. nov		Zhen	Ordovician		Australia	A member of Protopanderodontida.	
Misikella onouei	Sp. nov		Takemura & Rigo in Takemura et al.	Late Triassic		Japan		
Neostrachanognathus koikei	Sp. nov	Valid	Fukushima & Agematsu in Fukushima et al.	Early Triassic (Olenekian)		Japan; Malaysia; Oman; Russia; Thailand; Turkey	A member of the family Ellisoniidae.	
Polygnathus talenti	Sp. nov		Tagarieva	Devonian (Famennian)		Russia (Bashkortostan)		
Quadralella globosa	Sp. nov		Han & Zhao in Han et al.	Late Triassic (Carnian)	Maantang Formation	China		
Quadralella praedeflecta	Sp. nov		Han et al.	Late Triassic (Carnian)		China		
Tropodus repetskii	Sp. nov		Zhen	Ordovician	Emanuel Formation	Australia		

=== Conodont research ===
- New evidence of differences in the bioapatite structure of paraconodonts and euconodonts is presented by Ferretti et al. (2026).
- Goudemez et al. (2026) report evidence of covariation between the increase of sharpness of the blade and the reduction of the platform in the P_{1} element of the feeding apparatus of members of the genus Palmatolepis throughout the Famennian, likely related to increase in food processing abilities, and report possible evidence of trophic partitioning between juvenile and adult individuals of P. gracilis.
- Świś et al. (2026) report evidence of different strontium isotopic composition of bioapatite of conodonts from the Famennian strata from the Kowala Quarry (Poland) belonging to different genera, interpreted as likely resulting from trophic niche differentiation and/or different digestive physiology.
- Sanz-López et al. (2026) review the fossil record of members of the genus Declinognathodus and reconstruct their evolutionary history.
- Casas-Peña, Gutiérrez-Reyes & Navas-Parejo (2026) study the conodont biostratigraphy of the Rancho Nuevo Formation (Mexico), interpreted as indicative of late Moscovian–Kasimovian age of the studied formation.
- León-Caffroni et al. (2026) describe fossil material of Idioprioniodus conjunctus from the Carboniferous strata of the Itaituba Formation (Brazil) indicating that the species was not strictly confined to deep waters but also present in shallow epicontinental sea environment, and link its abundance in the studied area to the maximum flooding interval of the Amazonas Basin during the Bashkirian-Moscovian interval.
- Rojas Mantilla et al. (2026) report evidence of affinities of Carboniferous conodont assemblages from the Río Nevado Formation (Colombia) with conodonts from the North American Midcontinent.
- Xu et al. (2026) reconstruct the architecture of the multielement apparatus of Triassospathodus symmetricus.
- Qin et al. (2026) provide a biostratigraphic framework for the Middle Triassic strata of the Nanpenghe and the Xuanlai sections of the Baoshan Block (Yunnan, China) on the basis of the study of the local conodont fauna.
- Martínez-Pérez et al. (2026) reconstruct the architecture of the feeding apparatus of Pseudofurnishius murcianus on the basis of the study of fossil material from the Middle Triassic strata from External Dinarides (Slovenia).
- Zhang et al. (2026) provide a biostratigraphic framework for Late Triassic conodont assemblages from China, identifying 18 conodont biozones.
- Evidence of utility of sodium hydroxide for extraction of conodont fossil without affecting the results of their geochemical studies is presented by Rigo, Williams & Muto (2026).

== Amphibians ==
Name	Novelty	Status	Authors	Age	Type locality	Country	Notes	Images
Albadris	Gen. et sp. nov	Valid	Herring et al.	Carboniferous (Bashkirian)	Scottish Lower Coal Measures	United Kingdom	A nectridean of uncertain affinities. The type species is A. smithsoni.	
Arctobatrachus	Gen. et sp. nov	Valid	Schoch et al.	Middle Triassic (Ladinian)	Skuld Formation	Norway	A plagiosaurid temnospondyl. The type species is A. urdensis.	
Ambystoma quetzalcoatli	Sp. nov	Valid	Herrera-Flores & Velasco-de León	Late Pliocene	Atotonilco el Grande Formation	Mexico	An ambystomatid salamander; a species of Ambystoma.	
Changchunerpeton	Gen. et sp. nov	Valid	Jia et al.	Late Cretaceous (Campanian)	Nenjiang Formation	China	A hynobiid salamander. The type species is C. nonganensis.	
Gerrothorax maritimus	Sp. nov	Valid	Diao et al.	Late Triassic	Falang Formation	China	A plagiosaurid temnospondyl; a species of Gerrothorax.	
Limnospondylus	Gen. et sp. nov	Valid	Noda, Matsui & Nishikawa	Pliocene	Tsubusagawa Formation	Japan	A giant salamander. The type species is L. ajimuensis.	
Jeanerpeton	Gen. et sp. nov	Valid	Sefcovic et al.	Carboniferous (Moscovian)	Francis Creek Shale	United States (Illinois)	An early amphibamiform. The type species is J. mazonensis.	
Melanerpeton kuselense	Sp. nov	Valid	Schoch, Werneburg & Voigt	Carboniferous-Permian transition	Remigiusberg Formation	Germany	A dissorophoid temnospondyl.	
Nabia	Gen. et sp. nov	Valid	Guillaume et al.	Late Jurassic	Lourinha Formation, Alcobaça Formation	Portugal	A member of the family Albanerpetontidae. The type species is N. civiscientrix.	
Paranaschisma	Gen. et comb. nov	Valid	Kufner	Late Triassic	Colorado City Formation	United States (Texas)	A temnospondyl belonging to the family Metoposauridae. The type species is "Buettneria" howardensis Sawin (1944).	
Schoenfelderpeton brevifrons	Sp. nov	Valid	Schoch	Permian (Asselian)	Meisenheim Formation	Germany	A branchiosaurid temnospondyl.	
Spea labreae	Sp. nov	Valid	Cruz & Lindsey	Pleistocene	La Brea Tar Pits	United States (California)	An American spadefoot toad.	
Stenotosaurus aitoualii	Sp. nov	Valid	Dahoumane et al.	Middle Triassic		Algeria	A capitosauroid temnospondyl.	
Synorerpeton	Gen. et sp. nov	In press	Guillaume et al.	Late Cretaceous (Maastrichtian)	Tremp Formation	Spain	A member of the family Albanerpetontidae. The type species is S. ribagorzana.	
Syrtosuchus acuticornis	Sp. nov	Valid	Shumovskaya & Novikov	Early Triassic		Russia		
Tanyka	Gen. et sp. nov	Valid	Pardo et al.	Early Permian	Pedra de Fogo Formation	Brazil	An early tetrapodomorph. The type species is T. amnicola.	
Tecovaserpeton	Gen. et comb. nov	Valid	Kufner	Late Triassic	Tecovas Formation	United States (Texas)	A temnospondyl belonging to the family Metoposauridae. The type species is "Buettneria" perfecta Case (1922).	
Tyrannoroter	Gen. et sp. nov	Valid	Mann et al.	Carboniferous	Sydney Mines Formation	Canada (Nova Scotia)	A pantylid "microsaur". The type species is T. heberti.	

=== Amphibian research ===
- Molnar, Hutchinson & Pierce (2026) compare limb functions of musculoskeletal models of Acanthostega and Pederpes and an extant salamander and lizard, and report that hip and shoulder mobility of the studied early tetrapods was not compatible with movement patterns of the studied extant tetrapods, but find no evidence that limbs of Acanthostega and Pederpes were less adapted for weight support or hindlimb-based propulsion compared to the studied salamander and lizard.
- Pardo & Mann (2026) report evidence from the study of fossils of stem-tetrapod (megalichthyid, aistopod and embolomere) hatchlings from the Mazon Creek fossil beds (Illinois, United States) indicative of direct development of the studied animals, with no evidence of a larval stage similar to those seen in extant amphibians.
- Evidence from the study of Eusthenopteron foordi, Tiktaalik roseae, Acanthostega gunnari, Whatcheeria deltae, Greererpeton burkemorani, Trimerorhachis insignis and extant lake sturgeons, indicative of limited neck mobility in early tetrapods, is presented by Korneisel et al. (2026), who find no evidence of a significant shift in neck mobility coinciding with the head–shoulder separation.
- Igielman et al. (2026) provide new information on the anatomy of Westlothiana lizziae, and reinterpret it as a stem-tetrapod rather than a stem-amniote.
- Evidence from the study of skull bones of temnospondyls, indicative of higher measures of morphological disparity and rates of evolution of bones that were lost in lissamphibians compared to bones that were retained, is presented by Kean et al. (2026).
- A new temnospondyl specimen, preserving anatomical characters seen in dvinosaurs and in dissorophoids and possibly representing a paedomorphic adult, is described from the Carboniferous (Gzhelian) strata of the Graissessac Basin (France) by Logghe et al. (2026).
- Evidence of variability in number and sequence of growth marks between different bones of a single individual of Sclerocephalus nobilis is presented by Klein & Konietzko-Meier (2026).
- Konietzko-Meier & Klein (2026) identify chondroid bone in the lower jaw of Sclerocephalus nobilis, representing the first known record of this tissue in a non-amniote tetrapod and expanding known diversity of processes of bone formation in these tetrapods.
- Studied on the variability of the skull morphology of members of the genus Platyoposaurus between different individuals and throughout their life history are published by Uliakhin (2026).
- Schwarz et al. (2026) present a reconstruction of the principal musculature of the head of Mastodonsaurus.
- Description of the morphology of the postcranial skeleton of Gerrothorax pulcherrimus and its changes during the ontogeny of the animal is published by Witzmann & Schoch (2026).
- Kear et al. (2026) revise the fossil material attributed to Erythrobatrachus noonkanbahensis, interpreting it as a valid species on the basis of the study of the holotype, and interpreting the referred material as belonging to cf. Aphaneramma sp.
- Revision of the fossil record and skeletal anatomy of Apateon caducus is published by Schoch, Proust & Mujal (2026).
- Klein et al. (2026) compare bone histology of Apateon and extant salamanders, and find no evidence of shared patterns of histology and life history traits in extant and extinct neotenic taxa.
- Werneburg, Schneider & Štamberg (2026) describe new branchiosaurid fossil material from the Permian (Asselian) strata of the Padochov Formation (Czech Republic), and assign "Moraverpeton" remesi to the genus Branchiosaurus.
- Spinal cord supports, previously known only in extant and extinct salamanders, are identified in the vertebrae of caecilians by Santos, Wilkinson & Zaher (2026), who also identify shallow grooves on the inner walls of the neural canals as homologues of spinal cord supports, and identify such grooves in Wesserpeton evansae.
- Jansen et al. (2026) report the discovery of a new assemblage of amphibian fossils from the Campanian strata of the Villeveyrac-Mèze basin (France), including the oldest European members of the families Albanerpetontidae and Batrachosauroididae reported to date.
- A study on the composition of the Oligocene amphibian assemblage from the Coderet locality (France) is published by Monti et al.(2026).
- Description of the skull anatomy of Eoscapherpeton asiaticum is published by Kolchanov & Skutschas (2026).
- Syromyatnikova (2026) describes the anatomy of the skull of Mioproteus wezei on the basis of new fossil material from the Pliocene strata from North Caucasus (Russia).
- Isolated salamandrid (including Koalliella sp.) vertebrae are described from the Late Cretaceous (Campanian and Maastrichtian) localities in France by Macaluso et al. (2026), representing the oldest record of the group reported to date.
- Lemierre, Heinrich & Blackburn (2026) describe fossil material of members of Salientia from the Upper Jurassic Tendaguru Formation (Tanzania), including two humeri representing the oldest fossil record of members of frog crown group from Jurassic outcrops of Gondwana reported to date.
- A study on the composition of the Late Cretaceous (Coniacian or Santonian) frog assemblage from the In Becetèn locality (Niger), including the oldest known member of Ranoidea and a large indeterminate neobatrachian known from ornamented cranial material, is published by Lemierre et al. (2026).
- New fossil material of Gobiates sp. (the first confirmed record of a member of this genus from the Maastrichtian of Asia) and a large discoglossid-like anuran is reported from the Upper Cretaceous (Maastrichtian) strata of the Nemegt Formation (Mongolia) by Syromyatnikova, Skutschas & Kolchanov (2026).
- Lemierre et al. (2026) describe new fossil material of Hungarobatrachus szukacsi, providing new information on its anatomy and phylogenetic affinities.
- The first fossil material of tree frogs from the Pleistocene of the Urals is reported from the Makhnevskaya Ledyanaya Cave (Russia) by Tarasova et al. (2026).
- Turazzini & Gómez (2026) revise the fossil record of Pliocene toads from the Monte Hermoso Formation (Argentina), reporting evidence of presence of Rhinella diptycha or a related extinct taxon.
- A skeleton of a member of the genus Pelophylax, most closely resembling extant marsh frogs in limb bone proportions and sacral angulation, is described from the Oligocene strata of the Apt-Manosque-Forcalquier Basin (France) by Ponstein et al. (2026).
- A study on the composition of the Miocene frog assemblage from the Gargano Terre Rosse fissures (Italy) is published by Villa et al. (2026).
- Hiotis, Reed & Sherratt (2026) identify Late Pleistocene frog fossils from the Naracoorte Caves World Heritage Area (Australia) on the basis of the study of their ilial morphology.
- Ikeda, Takahashi & Hasegawa (2026) study the composition of the Pleistocene frog assemblage from the Minatogawa man site (Okinawa, Japan), reporting evidence of presence of taxa that are presently endemic to Okinawa, and evidence of presence of Fejervarya kawamurai, interpreted as indicative of natural dispersal of the species to Okinawa and refuting the possibility of its introduction by humans in the Holocene.
- A study on the composition of the Pleistocene frog assemblage from the Room 2 excavation at Cathedral Cave (Nevada, United States) is published by Salinas et al. (2026).
- A study on anuran fossils in the vertebrate assemblage from the Ravina das Araras (Rio Grande do Norte, Brazil), interpreted as consistent with presence of temporary bodies of water in a landscape dominated by open habitats during the late Quaternary, is published by Costa et al. (2026).
- Crudo, Turazzini & Gómez (2026) develops keys for identification of medium and large-sized anurans from Argentina on the basis of isolated bones, and reinterpret a purported specimen of Ceratophrys sp. from the Pliocene Monte Hermoso Formation as actually belonging to the genus Rhinella.
- Yu, Xu & Benson (2026) compare body size, cranial proportions, neck length and respiratory traits of Devonian to Permian land vertebrates, and find evidence of stronger constraints on body size evolution in the stem group of Lissamphibia compared to the stem group of Amniota, interpreted as likely linked to divergence of respiratory adaptations of the two groups.

== Synapsids ==
=== Non-mammalian synapsids ===
Name	Novelty	Status	Authors	Age	Type locality	Country	Notes	Images
Dinodontosaurus isiyavamanda	Sp. nov	Valid	George et al.	Triassic (late Ladinian–early Carnian)	Manda Beds	Tanzania	A kannemeyeriiform dicynodontian; a species of Dinodontosaurus.	
Jirahgorgon	Gen. et sp. nov	Valid	Macungo et al.	Permian	Abrahamskraal Formation	South Africa	A gorgonopsian in the family Phorcyidae. The type species is J. ceto.	
Megacauda	Gen. et sp. nov	Valid	Li et al.	Middle Jurassic (Callovian)	Haifanggou Formation	China	A member of Docodonta. Genus includes new species M. sungei.	
Njalila	Gen. et comb. nov	Valid	Gebauer & Maisch	Permian	Usili Formation	Tanzania	A gorgonopsian; a new genus for "Dixeya" nasuta Huene (1950).	
Parasilvia	Gen. et sp. nov	Valid	Bulanov, Shaymardanov & Papernyi	Permian		Russia (Orenburg Oblast)	A "dromasaur" anomodont with possible affinities with Galechirus. Genus includes new species P. alexandrae.	

==== Synapsid research ====
- A study on the diversity and evolution of the parietal foramen in Paleozoic and Triassic synapsids and reptiles is published by Jenkins et al. (2026).
- Warshaw, Singh & Benton (2026) evaluate possible factors influencing cranial shape evolution in carnivorous Permian synapsids, and identify adaptation for trophic functions as the primary driver influencing the cranial shape.
- Benoit et al. (2026) study endocasts of Permian and Triassic synapsids, and report evidence of a steady increase in encephalization that stalled after the Capitanian mass extinction event and did not resume until the Triassic, with no evidence of changes coinciding with environmental upheavals of the Permian–Triassic extinction event.
- A synapsid (likely caseid) tail impression preserving probable traces of epidermal scales and cloacal opening is reported from the Permian (Asselian) strata of the Tambach Formation (Germany) by Marchetti et al. (2026).
- Bakaev & Suchkova (2026) report the discovery of fossil material of Ennatosaurus tecton from the Permian (Guadalupian) strata from Udmurtia (Russia), representing the easternmost record of the species reported to date and providing evidence of faunal exchange between the Mezen fauna from the Arkhangelsk region and the Golysherma fauna in the Cis-Ural region, previously thought to be completely isolated by the Kazan Sea at the beginning of middle Permian.
- Probable ophiacodontid tracks assigned to the ichnospecies Dimetropus osageorum, preserving imprints of epidermal scales from the pes, are described from the Permian (Artinskian) Rabéjac Formation (Lodève Basin; France) by Logghe, Buffa & Marchetti (2026).
- Angielczyk et al. (2026) describe a natural mold of a vertebra of a synapsid and a natural mold of a partial maxilla of a synapsid with sphenacodont affinities from the Permian (Cisuralian) Pedra de Fogo Formation (Brazil), representing the first definitive pelycosaur-grade synapsids reported from South America.
- A study on the dynamics of diversification and extinction of ophiacodontids, edaphosaurids and sphenacodontids, based on an updated dataset from the study of Didier & Laurin (2024), is published by Laurin et al. (2026), who find evidence that the slowdown in diversification of the studied synapsids began at the Carboniferous/Permian transition (earlier than indicated by the 2024 study), coinciding with a moderate extinction event, as well as evidence of a more severe extinction event in the mid-Kungurian.
- Snyder, Snively & Brink (2026) study the biomechanical properties of teeth of Dimetrodon, interpreted as consistent with adaptations of teeth of the studied synapsid to processing of large prey.
- Evidence from the study of bone histology, indicative of different growth strategies of Dimetrodon teutonis and diminutive North American members of the genus Dimetrodon, is provided by Canoville et al. (2026).
- Bishop & Pierce (2026) reconstruct the musculature of the forelimbs of Dimetrodon milleri, Oudenodon bainii, Lycaenops ornatus, Massetognathus pascuali and Vincelestes neuquenianus.
- A study on the phylogenetic relationships of therapsids is published by Duhamel et al. (2026).
- Santos et al. (2026) desribe new dinocephalian fossil material from the Permian (Guadalupian) strata of the Rio do Rasto Formation (Brazil), providing evidence of presence of members of this group in several distinct sedimentary levels of the strata from the Boqueirão Farm outcrop.
- Benoit et al. (2026) provide new information on the neurology of Moschops on the basis of the study of skulls of specimens from the Abrahamskraal Formation (South Africa), interpreted as consistent with adaptations to head butting and possibly to semiaquatic habitat, and report possible evidence of preservation of brain soft tissue.
- Evidence of stable morphospace occupation by dicynodont beaks throughout the Permian-Triassic transition, as well as evidence of different function of beaks of contemporary dicynodonts, turtles and archosauromorphs that were likely linked to different feeding behaviors, is presented by Landi et al. (2026).
- Benoit, Fernandez & Botha (2026) identify a curled perinate specimen of Lystrosaurus from the Lower Triassic strata of the Balfour or Katberg Formation (South Africa) as likely to be an embryo originally preserved within an egg, and interpret Lystrosaurus as a precocial animal unlikely to feed on milk.
- Evidence from the study of five bonebeds from the Middle Triassic strata of the Pinheiros-Chiniquá Sequence of the Santa Maria Supersequence (Brazil) dominated by remains of young individuals of Dinodontosaurus tener, interpreted as supporting gregarious behavior and age segregation of herds of members of this species, is presented by Battista & Francischini (2026).
- Shi et al. (2026) describe fossil material of dicynodonts with possible stahleckeriid affinities from the Upper Triassic Momonoki Formation, representing the oldest record of synapsids from Japan reported to date.
- Sennikov & Mednikov (2026) describe the anatomy of the manus of Koksharovia grechovi, interpreted as suggestive of adaptation to digging.
- Suchkova, Bulanov & Masyutin (2026) report evidence of preservation of remains of a specimen of Emeroleter levis within the abdominal cavity of a specimen of Viatkosuchus sumini from the Permian (Capitanian) strata from the Kotel'nich locality (Kirov Oblast, Russia).
- Redescription of the anatomy of the skull of Choerosaurus dejageri is published by Gigliotti et al. (2026).
- Stuart et al. (2026) provide an updated description of Microgomphodon oligocynus on the basis of the study of fossil material from the Middle Triassic strata from the Karoo Basin (South Africa), and interpret its morphology as indicative of fossoriality of members of this species.
- Redescription and a study on the affinities of Cistecynodon parvus is published by Lund et al. (2026).
- Description of the maxillary canal system in Cynognathus and Diademodon is published by Benoit, Buffa & Day (2026).
- Kerber & Werneburg (2026) study the anatomy and affinities of "Traversodon" major, and consider it to be a nomen dubium.
- Description of the anatomy of the pectoral girdle and forelimb of Siriusgnathus niemeyerorum is published by Martins & Kerber (2026).
- Gaetano et al. (2026) identify a probable neonatal line in a large specimen of Chiniquodon theotonicus from the Carnian Chañares Formation (Argentina), determine that the size of the studied individual at birth was comparable with those seen in extant placental mammals, and interpret C. theotonicus as likely to be viviparous.
- Michelotti et al. (2026) describe new fossil material of Prozostrodon brasiliensis from the Triassic strata of the Santa Maria Supersequence (Brazil), providing new information on the postcranial anatomy and bone histology of members of this species.
- Guo, Zhou & Zhao (2026) study the histology of a fibula of an indeterminate docodontan from the Jurassic Tiaojishan Formation (China), reporting evidence of a cyclical growth during early life and possible adapations to fossoriality.
- Averianov & Sues (2026) report the discovery of an isolated ulna of Docodon from the Upper Jurassic Morrison Formation (Wyoming, United States), and find no evidence of fossorial or aquatic adaptations.
- Evidence from the study of bone histology indicative of diversity of growth strategies of Mesozoic docodonts, euharamiyidans and multituberculates is provided by Kulik et al. (2026).

== Other animals ==
Name	Novelty	Status	Authors	Age	Type locality	Country	Notes	Images
Anabarites yuanbaoshanensis	Sp. nov		Chen et al.	Ediacaran	Dengying Formation	China		
Annuloserpula	Gen. et comb. nov	Valid	Jäger et al.	Upper Hettangian to upper Pliensbachian or lower Toarcian	Beni Hammad Formation, Beni Amyir Formation, "Beta-Kalkbank"	Germany France Morocco United Kingdom	A serpulid tubeworm. The type species is "Serpula etalensis" Piette (1856).	
Arborea elegans	Sp. nov	Valid	Rosse-Guillevic, Olschewski & McIlroy	Ediacaran	Mistaken Point Formation	Canada (Newfoundland and Labrador)	A species of Arborea.	3D reconstruction of Arborea elegans in its environment.
Ateilophus	Nom. nov	Valid	Rivera-Sylva	Devonian		Algeria	A polychaete; a replacement name for Lophos Termier, Termier & de Lapparent (1973).	
Avannaascolex	Gen. et sp. nov	Valid	Farrell et al.	Cambrian	Buen Formation	Greenland	A member of Palaeoscolecidomorpha. The type species is A. apalos.	
Biplicatella	Gen. et comb. et sp. nov	Valid	Peel	Cambrian	Qiaonzhusi (Chiungchussu) Formation	China; Greenland	A member of Hyolitha. The type species is "Linevitus" opimus Yu (1974); genus also includes new species B. skovstedi.	
Botomospongia	Gen. et sp. nov	Valid	Kolesnikov	Cambrian	Sinsk Formation	Russia	A stem-hexactinellid. Genus includes new species B. sphaeroides.	
Brachiolites elongatus	Sp. nov	Valid	Świerczewska-Gładysz & Olszewska-Nejbert	Late Cretaceous (Cenomanian)		Ukraine	A sponge.	
Cloudina? petala	Sp. nov		Chen et al.	Ediacaran	Dengying Formation	China		
Cornulites bernardezi	Sp. nov	Valid	Vinn & Gutiérrez-Marco	Ordovician (Katian)	Agüeira Formation	Spain		
Cornulites hemistriatus	Sp. nov	Valid	Jin & Vinn	Ordovician		Canada (Quebec)		
Cystostroma dongkaense	Sp. nov		Jeon et al.	Silurian (Aeronian)	Dongka Group	China	A member of Stromatoporoidea belonging to the family Rosenellidae.	
Cystostroma satunense	Sp. nov		Jeon et al.	Ordovician (Darriwilian)		Thailand		
Dengyingia	Gen. et sp. nov		Chen et al.	Ediacaran	Dengying Formation	China	A frondose fossil sharing morphological similarities with Ediacaran frondomorphs and with extant sea pens. The type species is D. pennata.	
Dickinsonia densa	Sp. nov		Sozonov et al.	Ediacaran	Cherny/Chernyi Kamen Formation	Russia		
Dictyotubulus	Gen. et sp. nov		Chen et al.	Ediacaran	Dengying Formation	China	A skeletal fossil that might represent a morphologically complex animal. Genus includes new species D. circularis.	
Ecclimadictyon gejingae	Sp. nov		Jeon et al.	Silurian (Aeronian)	Dongka Group	China	A member of Stromatoporoidea belonging to the family Actinodictyidae.	
Edrathina	Gen. et sp. nov	Valid	Muirhead-Hunt, Rosse-Guillevic & McIlroy	Ediacaran	Inner Meadow Lagerstätte	Canada (Newfoundland and Labrador)	A member of the stem group of Ctenophora. The type species is E. obditchia.	
?Eximipriapulus vannieri	Sp. nov		Vinn, Toom & Moghalu	Ordovician (Hirnantian)		Latvia	A member of Priapulida.	
Filogranula mogenstrupensis	Sp. nov	Valid	Kočí et al.	Oligocene	Brejning Formation	Denmark	A serpulid tubeworm.	
Frutectis	Gen. et sp. nov	Valid	Pervushov	Late Cretaceous (Santonian)		Russia (Tambov Oblast)	A hexactinellid sponge belonging to the family Staurodermatidae. The type species is F. urnula.	
Guanduscolex hexagonus	Sp. nov	Valid	Shi et al.	Cambrian	Wulongqing Formation	China	A palaeoscolecid.	
Hydroides engi	Sp. nov	Valid	Goedert, Rich & Kočí	Eocene	Cowlitz Formation	United States (Washington)	A polychaete, a species of Hydroides.	
Hydroides vandeirai	Sp. nov		Arouca et al.	Eocene	La Meseta Formation	Antarctica	A polychaete, a species of Hydroides.	
Kennardia tepperi	Sp. nov	Valid	Brock & Paterson in Brock et al.	Cambrian	Parara Limestone	Australia	A tommotiid.	
Khmilevskia	Gen. et sp. nov	Valid	Świerczewska-Gładysz & Olszewska-Nejbert	Late Cretaceous (Cenomanian)		Ukraine	A hexactinellid sponge belonging to the family Ventriculitidae. The type species is K. papillata.	
Kuanchuanpivermis	Gen. et sp. nov	Valid	Xian et al.	Cambrian (Fortunian)	Kuanchuanpu Formation	China	A polychaete. The type species is K. brevicruris.	
Labyrintholites cassus	Sp. nov	Valid	Pervushov	Late Cretaceous (Santonian)		Russia (Saratov Oblast)	A hexactinellid sponge belonging to the family Euretidae.	
Labyrintholites conoides	Sp. nov	Valid	Pervushov	Late Cretaceous (Santonian)		Russia (Saratov Oblast)	A hexactinellid sponge belonging to the family Euretidae.	
Labyrintholites crassidiscus	Sp. nov	Valid	Pervushov	Late Cretaceous (Santonian)		Russia (Saratov Oblast)	A hexactinellid sponge belonging to the family Euretidae.	
Labyrintholites globosus	Sp. nov	Valid	Pervushov	Late Cretaceous (Santonian)		Russia (Saratov Oblast)	A hexactinellid sponge belonging to the family Euretidae.	
Labyrintholites ollae	Sp. nov	Valid	Pervushov	Late Cretaceous (Santonian)		Russia (Saratov Oblast)	A hexactinellid sponge belonging to the family Euretidae.	
Labyrintholites planifructectum	Sp. nov	Valid	Pervushov	Late Cretaceous (Santonian)		Russia (Saratov Oblast)	A hexactinellid sponge belonging to the family Euretidae.	
Labyrintholites urnule	Sp. nov	Valid	Pervushov	Late Cretaceous (Santonian)		Russia (Saratov Oblast)	A hexactinellid sponge belonging to the family Euretidae.	
Machairascolex	Gen. et sp. nov	Valid	Parry, Lukeneder & Lukeneder	Late Triassic (Carnian)		Austria	A polychaete belonging to the group Eunicoidea. The type species is M. hofreiteri.	
Mazovermes	Gen. et sp. nov		Nanglu, Wittry & McCoy	Carboniferous	Mazon Creek fossil beds	United States (Illinois)	A polychaete. The type species is M. magnaterminus.	
Nogrobs (Tetralysis) zekkarensis	Sp. nov	Valid	Jäger et al.	Upper Pliensbachian or lower Toarcian	Beni Hammad Formation, Beni Amyir Formation	Morocco	A serpulid tubeworm.	
Nogrobs (Tetraditrupa) folkestonensis	Sp. nov	Valid	Jäger et al.	Cenomanian	Upper Greensand Formation	Germany United Kingdom	A serpulid tubeworm. Nom. nov. pro "Serpula rustica" J. de C. Sowerby (1829).	
Ophrystoma olehii	Sp. nov	Valid	Świerczewska-Gładysz & Olszewska-Nejbert	Late Cretaceous (Cenomanian)		Ukraine	A sponge.	
Placostegus vilsundensis	Sp. nov	Valid	Kočí et al.	Oligocene	Brejning Formation	Denmark	A serpulid tubeworm.	
Plocoscyphia anastomosa	Sp. nov	Valid	Świerczewska-Gładysz & Olszewska-Nejbert	Late Cretaceous (Cenomanian)		Ukraine	A sponge.	
Protarabellites luztejadae	Sp. nov	Valid	Carlorosi et al.	Ordovician (Darriwilian)	San José Formation	Peru	A polychaete belonging to the family Ramphoprionidae.	
Spinosoma	Gen. et sp. nov		Zhang et al.	Cambrian (Fortunian)	Liuchapo Formation	China	An ecdysozoan of uncertain affinities, possibly a scalidophoran. The type species is S. reticulatus. The generic name is shared with Spinosoma Breuning (1950).	
Subtenuis	Gen. et sp. nov	Valid	Pervushov	Late Cretaceous (Santonian)		Russia (Tambov Oblast)	A hexactinellid sponge belonging to the family Ventriculitidae. The type species is S. caurus.	
Thamnobeatricea kanchanaburiensis	Sp. nov		Jeon et al.	Ordovician (Darriwilian)		Thailand	A member of Stromatoporoidea.	
Tretodictyum complicatus	Sp. nov	Valid	Świerczewska-Gładysz & Olszewska-Nejbert	Late Cretaceous (Cenomanian)		Ukraine	A sponge.	
Tretodictyum petrivensis	Sp. nov	Valid	Świerczewska-Gładysz & Olszewska-Nejbert	Late Cretaceous (Cenomanian)		Ukraine	A sponge.	
Tubuloreticulaspongia	Gen. et sp. nov		Hang et al.	Ordovician and Silurian (Hirnantian to Rhuddanian)		China	A protospongiid sponge. Genus includes new species T. sinensis.	
Vosgesochaeta	Gen. et et sp. nov	Valid	Tzetlin et al.	Middle Triassic (Anisian)	Grès à Voltzia	France	A polychaete belonging to the family Nereididae. The type species is V. grauvogeli.	
Yujingia	Gen. et sp. nov	Valid	He et al.	Cambrian		China	An early member of Ambulacraria. Genus includes new species Y. glutenotunica.	
Zhangjiagoivermis	Gen. et sp. nov	Valid	Xian et al.	Cambrian (Fortunian)	Kuanchuanpu Formation	China	A polychaete. The type species is Z. longicruris.	
Zofiaprion	Nom. nov	Valid	Edkins	Silurian		Poland; Russia	A polychaete; a replacement name for Leptoprion Kielan-Jaworowska (1966).	

=== Other animal research ===
- Boan & Droser (2026) interpret cases of contant of margins of specimens of Aspidella from the Ediacara Member of the Rawnsley Quartzite (Australia) as more likely representing competitive interactions (overgrowth) than reproductive process.
- Probable evidence of chemosymbiosis of Conotubus with sulfur-oxidizing bacteria is presented by Wang et al. (2026).
- Wang & Yang (2026) find no evidence of biologically controlled mineralization in specimens of Cloudina and Sinotubulites from South China, Paraguay and Namibia.
- A study on the biogeography and changes of diversity of Cambrian chancelloriids throughout the evolutionary history of the group is published by Yun & Zhang (2026).
- Rossi et al. (2026) reconstruct the evolutionary history of sponges on the basis of a phylogeny recovered from phylogenomic analyses and molecular clock analyses constraining the age of 12 major sponge clades on the basis of the fossil record, and interpret their findings as indicative of an Ediacaran origin of sponges, as well as indicating that the ancestral sponges were not biomineralized and lacked spicules, and that biosilicification and biocalcification evolved independently in multiple sponge lineages.
- Qureshi et al. (2026) study probable functions of the thorny corolla and T-shaped ridges in the spines of Yukonensis yukonensis, interpreting the latter structures as unlikely to improve structural reinforcement.
- A study on the composition of the assemblage of hexactinellid sponges from the Ordovician Cabrières Biota (France), identifying features of the studied biota shared with and distinct from sponges from the Fezouata and Klabava biotas, is published by Li & Reitner (2026).
- Lee (2026) interprets the emergence of high-relief reef construction in the Silurian as linked to the diversification of stromatoporoids with rigid skeletal framework rather than to environmental factors.
- Wang et al. (2026) provide new information on material properties of tissues of Charniodiscus, interpreted as consistent with eumetazoan affinities of the studied animal.
- Evidence of motility and behavioral handedness of specimens of Spriggina floundersi is reported by Evans et al. (2026).
- Wu et al. (2026) describe fossil material of Kimberella from the Ediacaran Shibantan Member of the Dengying Formation (China), representing one of the youngest known records of this genus and extending its known spatial distribution.
- McCandless et al. (2026) report evidence of wide distribution of Kimberella quadrata throughout the Ediacara Member of the Rawnsley Quartzite (Australia), and interpret its morphology as consistent with lophotrochozoan and possibly with stem-molluscan affinities.
- Possible early segmented bilaterian fossils preserved as microbial pseudomorphs are reported from the Cambrian (Fortunian) strata of the Kuanchuanpu Formation (Shaanxi, China) by Yang et al. (2026).
- Nagovitsyn, Ivantsov & Zakrevskaya (2026) describe new body impressions and traces of Parvancorina from the Ediacaran strata from the southeastern White Sea area (Russia), find no evidence of presence of arthropod-like lateral appendages on the lower side of the animal, and report evidence of presence of a mucus-secreting foot enabling movement similar to those of extant gastropods.
- A study on the composition of the assemblage of worm-like animals from the Cabrières Biota is published by Vannier et al. (2026), who report evidence of presence of both scalidophorans and possible lophotrochozoan worms.
- Possible evidence of systematic, rhythmic behavioral changes in a population of Silurian worm-like animals is reported on the basis of study of trace fossils from the Llandovery Qingshui Formation (Hubei, China) by Liu et al. (2026).
- Peel (2026) interprets the tubular fossil Hyolithellus micans and its operculum Discinella micans as described on the basis of remains of an annelid, possibly a stem-polychaete.
- Evidence of reduction in body size of scolecodonts across the Frasnian/Famennian Kellwasser Events, possibly linked to oxygen stress, is presented by Chilcoat & Cohen (2026).
- Vinn et al. (2026) report the discovery of possible remains of a lophophore in specimens of Cornulites from the Silurian Kaochiapien Formation (Hubei, China), supporting the classification of cornulitids as lophophorates.
- A study on the structure of sclerites of early Cambrian eccentrothecimorph tommotiids from Australia, including description of the newly discovered scleritome of Kulparina rostrata, is published by Fjeld et al. (2026).
- New information on the anatomy of "Pelagiella" subangulata, based on the study of new, well-preserved fossil material from the Cambrian strata from Flinders Ranges (Australia), is presented by Richter Stretton et al. (2026).
- A study on the growth pattern of Cricocosmia jinningensis, indicative of a shift towards reinforcement of sclerites at the juvenile–adult transition, is published by Shi et al. (2026).
- Xiao et al. (2026) report the discovery of a probable specimen of Wronascolex sp. from the Cambrian (Wuliuan) Tianpeng Formation (Yunnan, China), preserved with taphonomical features interpreted as broadly consistent with Burgess Shale-type preservation.
- The youngest fossil material of a selkirkiid scalidophoran reported to date is described from the Devonian (Pragian) strata of the La Roche Formation (Belgium) by Van Roy et al. (2026).
- The first fossils of members of the genus Quadratapora found outside of South China and Siberia are reported from the Cambrian strata from South Australia and Kazakhstan by Beidatsch et al. (2026).
- Evidence supporting the interpretation of luolishaniid lobopodians as epibenthic suspension feeders is presented by Richards & Ortega-Hernández (2026).
- Zhang et al. (2026) identify pit-like microstructures on the underside of plates of armor of Microdictyon sp. from the Cambrian Shuijingtuo Formation (Shaanxi, China), and interpret them as probable attachment points for leg muscles.
- Tian et al. (2026) identify vessels with protein and iron signatures in yunnanozoans specimens from the Cambrian strata of the Maotianshan Shale Member of the Yu'anshan Formation (China), interpreted as ventral and dorsal aortae.

== Foraminifera ==
Name	Novelty	Status	Authors	Age	Type locality	Country	Notes	Images
Ammobaculites oieensis	Sp. nov		Matting & Reich	Eocene (Ypresian)		Germany	A member of Lituolida belonging to the family Lituolidae.	
Davanella	Gen. et 2 sp. nov	Valid	Okuyucu & Akba	Permian (Capitanian)		Turkey	A member of Cornuspiroidea belonging to the family Neodiscidae. The type species is D. ankaraensis; genus also includes D. acuminata.	
Earlandia giga	Sp. nov		Vinn et al.	Silurian		Estonia		
Endothyranopsis media	Sp. nov		Cózar, Somerville & Hounslow	Carboniferous (Tournaisian and Viséan)		China; United Kingdom	A member of Bradyinoidea belonging to the family Endothyranopsidae.	
Endothyranopsis prima	Sp. nov		Cózar, Somerville & Hounslow	Carboniferous (Viséan)		United Kingdom	A member of Bradyinoidea belonging to the family Endothyranopsidae.	
Endothyranopsis septacrassa	Sp. nov		Cózar, Somerville & Hounslow	Carboniferous (Viséan)		United Kingdom	A member of Bradyinoidea belonging to the family Endothyranopsidae.	
Gerochammina calloviensis	Sp. nov		Jalloh & Kaminski	Middle Jurassic	Dhruma Formation	Saudi Arabia	A member of the family Prolixoplectinidae.	
Kaganella	Gen. et sp. nov	Valid	Okuyucu & Akba	Permian (Capitanian)		Turkey	A member of Cornuspiroidea belonging to the family Neodiscidae. The type species is K. tekini.	
Latiendothyranopsis paramenneri	Sp. nov		Cózar, Somerville & Hounslow	Carboniferous (Viséan)		United Kingdom	A member of Bradyinoidea belonging to the family Endothyranopsidae.	
Marginulina reticulata	Sp. nov	Valid	Glinskikh	Middle Jurassic (Bajocian)		Russia		
Neaguina	Gen. et comb. nov	Valid	Schlagintweit	Cretaceous		France; Iran; Italy; Morocco; Northwestern Pacific Ocean; Oman; Croatia?	A member of Textulariida. The type species is "Cuneolina" laurentii Sartoni & Crescenti (1962); genus also includes "Cuneolina" hensoni Dalbiez (1958) and "Cuneolina" sliteri Arnaud-Vanneau & Premoli-Silva (1995).	
Novellopsis	Gen. et comb. nov	Valid	Vachard in Lucas et al.	Carboniferous and Permian		China; Donbas; Spain; United States (New Mexico)	A member of Fusulinata belonging to the superfamily Ozawainelloidea. The type species is Novella pulchra Potievskaya (1964); genus also includes "Eostaffella" digitalis Manukalova, "Eostaffella digitalis" var. longa Manukalova (1950), "Eostaffella" dolixa Manukalova (1950), "Eostaffella dolixa" forma minima Manukalova (1950), "Eostaffella" levenconica Manukalova-Grebenyuk, Ilyina & Serezhnikova (1969) and "Millerella" pulchella Chen et al. (1991).	
Orbitolinopsis bilottei	Sp. nov	Valid	Schlagintweit & Doubrawa	Late Cretaceous (Campanian)		France		
Plectogyranopsis cumbriensis	Sp. nov		Cózar, Somerville & Hounslow	Carboniferous (Viséan)		United Kingdom	A member of Bradyinoidea belonging to the family Endothyranopsidae.	
Rectocribranopsis cantabrica	Sp. nov		Cózar, Somerville & Hounslow	Carboniferous (Viséan and Serpukhovian)		Morocco; Spain	A member of Bradyinoidea belonging to the family Endothyranopsidae.	
Rectogordiopsis	Gen. et 2 sp. nov	Valid	Okuyucu & Akba	Permian (Capitanian)		Turkey	A member of Cornuspiroidea belonging to the family Neodiscidae. The type species is R. kamuranaeformis; genus also includes R. ovaliformis.	
Reitlingeropsis evoluta	Sp. nov		Cózar, Somerville & Hounslow	Carboniferous (Serpukhovian)		Morocco	A member of Bradyinoidea belonging to the family Endothyranopsidae.	
Reitlingeropsis lata	Sp. nov		Cózar, Somerville & Hounslow	Carboniferous (Viséan and Serpukhovian)		Morocco	A member of Bradyinoidea belonging to the family Endothyranopsidae.	
Reitlingeropsis magna	Sp. nov		Cózar, Somerville & Hounslow	Carboniferous (Serpukhovian and Bashkirian)		Algeria; Morocco; Russia; Spain	A member of Bradyinoidea belonging to the family Endothyranopsidae.	
Reitlingeropsis multicamerata	Sp. nov		Cózar, Somerville & Hounslow	Carboniferous (Serpukhovian)		France	A member of Bradyinoidea belonging to the family Endothyranopsidae.	
Sievoides blumenthali	Sp. nov	Valid	Solak	Early Jurassic		Turkey	A member of Loftusiida belonging to the family Cribratinidae.	
Spirallopsis	Gen. et sp. nov		Cózar, Somerville & Hounslow	Carboniferous (Serpukhovian)		Spain	A member of Bradyinoidea belonging to the family Endothyranopsidae. The type species is S. delicata.	
Vachardopsis	Gen. et 3 sp. nov		Cózar, Somerville & Hounslow	Carboniferous (Viséan)		United Kingdom; Czech Republic?	A member of Bradyinoidea belonging to the family Endothyranopsidae. The type species is V. directa; genus also includes V. distorta and possibly V? inflata.	

=== Foraminiferal research ===
- Cózar, Somerville & Hounslow (2026) revise the phylogenetic relationships and evolutionary history of earliest members of Fusulinida, and consider fusulinids to be more likely a polyphyletic group than a monophyletic one.
- A study on the evolution of diversity, body size and architectural complexity of Triassic foraminifera is published by Gale (2026).
- Evidence of gradual changes of composition of the foraminiferal assemblage from the Pieniny Klippen Belt (Ukraine) in response to environmental changes during the Sinemurian-Pliensbachian transition is presented by Józsa et al. (2026).
- Golfinopoulos et al. (2026) report the first discovery of benthic foraminifera from the Lower Jurassic strata exposed in Greece.
- Evidence linking foraminiferal extinctions during the Oceanic Anoxic Event 1b to ocean acidification is presented by Chen et al. (2026).
- Lowery et al. (2026) constrain the duration of the interval between the extinction of the Cretaceous species and the first appearance of Parvularugoglobigerina eugubina to between 3,500 and 11,100 years, and report evidence of appearance of as many as 10 new species of planktic foraminifera in this interval, with the first appearing less than 2,000 years after the Chicxulub impact initiating the Cretaceous–Paleogene extinction event.
- A study on the phylogenetic relationships of Cenozoic planktonic foraminiferal taxa is published by Lamyman et al. (2026).
- Lu et al. (2026) study changes of foraminiferal species richness during the Eocene-Oligocene transition, reporting evidence of distinct evolutionary histories of marine foraminifera living in different habitats.

== Other organisms ==
Name	Novelty	Status	Authors	Age	Type locality	Country	Notes	Images
Angochitina tuojiangensis	Sp. nov		Wu et al.	Devonian		China	A chitinozoan.	
Archaeocenosphaera plankei	Sp. nov		Ozsvárt et al.	Early Triassic		Norway	A radiolarian.	
Archeoentactinia heptactinia	Sp. nov		Sheng et al.	Cambrian (Miaolingian)	Inca Formation	Australia	A polycystine radiolarian belonging to the group Archaeospicularia and the family Echidninidae.	
Archeoentactinia pentactinia	Sp. nov		Sheng et al.	Cambrian (Miaolingian)	Inca Formation	Australia	A polycystine radiolarian belonging to the group Archaeospicularia and the family Echidninidae.	
Avannacystis	Gen. et sp. nov		Willman & Peel	Cambrian (Wuliuan)	Henson Gletscher Formation	Greenland	A colonizing microbe of uncertain affinities (possibly chytrid-like fungus) described on the basis of vesicular fossils attached to, or embedded within, shells of the tommotiid Tesella. Genus includes new species A. polaris.	
Bayangolia	Gen. et sp. nov	Valid	Luzhnaya	Ediacaran-Cambrian		Mongolia	An organism of uncertain affinities, possibly a bacterial colony. Genus includes new species B. vesiculosa.	
Choanocystis bulla	Sp. nov		Siver	Eocene		Canada (Northwest Territories)	A centrohelid heliozoan.	
Colinetia	Gen. et sp. nov	Valid	Fitzgerald et al.	Ediacaran	Mall Bay Formation	Canada (Newfoundland and Labrador)	A soft-bodied organism of uncertain affinities. The type species is C. daltonensis.	
Conochitina clavatus	Sp. nov	Valid	Liang et al.	Ordovician	Dawan Formation	China	A chitinozoan.	
Conochitina tenellensis	Sp. nov	Valid	Liang et al.	Ordovician	Dawan Formation	China	A chitinozoan.	
?Entactinia meishanensis smyraksikorae	Ssp. nov		Ozsvárt et al.	Early Triassic		Norway	A radiolarian.	
?Entactinia sengeri	Sp. nov		Ozsvárt et al.	Early Triassic		Norway	A radiolarian.	
Grandetortura nipponica stepheni	Ssp. nov		Ozsvárt et al.	Early Triassic		Norway	A radiolarian.	
Haplotaeniatum wufengensis	Sp. nov		Sheng, Aitchison & Kachovich in Sheng et al.	Ordovician (Katian)	Wufeng Formation	China	A radiolarian belonging to the group Spumellaria and the family Haplotaeniatidae.	
Heziaosphaera	Gen. et sp. nov	Valid	Lole Durbin, O'Donnell & Xiao	Cambrian	Yanjiahe Formation	China	An acritarch. The type species is H. bimorphospina.	
Kamounia	Gen. et sp. nov		Strullu-Derrien in Strullu-Derrien et al.	Carboniferous		France	A possible member of Peronosporomycetes. The type species is K. striata.	
Lagenochitina yangtzensis	Sp. nov	Valid	Liang et al.	Ordovician	Dawan Formation	China	A chitinozoan.	
Morania sibirica	Sp. nov	Valid	Rozhnov, Semenov & Nogovitsin	Cambrian (Miaolingian)		Russia (Sakha Republic)	A cyanobacterium.	
Ouroboros	Gen. et 3 sp. nov		Strother et al.	Mesoproterozoic	Nonesuch Shale	United States (Michigan)	Organic-walled microfossils that might be remains of members of Euglenales. The type species is O. soroboruo; genus also includes O. vulgaris (known also from the Applecross and Diabaig formations, United Kingdom) and O. torus.	
Pachycingula alta	Sp. nov	Valid	Vishnevskaya	Late Jurassic	Bazhenov Formation	Russia (Yamalo-Nenets Autonomous Okrug)	A radiolarian.	
Pachycingula capitata	Sp. nov	Valid	Vishnevskaya	Late Jurassic	Bazhenov Formation	Russia (Yamalo-Nenets Autonomous Okrug)	A radiolarian.	
Pachycingula laevigata	Sp. nov	Valid	Vishnevskaya	Late Jurassic	Bazhenov Formation	Russia (Yamalo-Nenets Autonomous Okrug)	A radiolarian.	
Pachycingula praebiporata	Sp. nov	Valid	Vishnevskaya	Late Jurassic	Bazhenov Formation	Russia (Yamalo-Nenets Autonomous Okrug)	A radiolarian.	
Philophrosyne	Gen. et sp. nov		Krings, Bomfleur & Kerp	Devonian	Dryden Flags Formation	United Kingdom	A possible member of Saprolegniales. Genus includes new species P. beckeri.	
Pterocystis giraffensis	Sp. nov		Siver	Eocene		Canada (Northwest Territories)	A centrohelid heliozoan.	
Quendis spatha	Sp. nov		Siver	Eocene		Canada (Northwest Territories)	A centrohelid heliozoan.	
Raphidocystis eocenensis	Sp. nov		Siver	Eocene		Canada (Northwest Territories)	A centrohelid heliozoan.	
Raphidocystis kanowa	Sp. nov		Siver	Eocene		Canada (Northwest Territories)	A centrohelid heliozoan.	
Raphidocystis reticula	Sp. nov		Siver	Eocene		Canada (Northwest Territories)	A centrohelid heliozoan.	
Streptubularia robustus	Sp. nov	Valid	Shen et al.	Cambrian	Qingxudong Formation	China	A cyanobacterium belonging to the group Oscillatoriales.	
Thaisphaera ullarinmanae	Sp. nov		Ozsvárt et al.	Early Triassic		Norway	A radiolarian.	
Xianella mollis	Sp. nov	Valid	Shen et al.	Cambrian	Qingxudong Formation	China	A cyanobacterium belonging to the group Oscillatoriales.	

=== Research on other organisms ===
- Carbonaceous microfossils interpreted as remains of organic-walled microorganisms are described from the 2.7-billion-years-old strata of the Tumbiana Formation (Australia) by Ouyang et al. (2026).
- Hagen et al. (2026) determine the processes responsible for silicification of organic tissues of Cambrian cyanobacteria from the Harkless Formation (Nevada, United States).
- Liu et al. (2026) study the cellular structure of branches of Kordephyton from the Cambrian (Miaolingian) Mantou Formation (China), interpreted as iron-mineralized coccoid cyanobacterial colonies.
- Cyanobacteria with morphological similarities to Chroococcidiopsis and Gloeocapsopsis, colonized by parasitic chytrid fungi or chytrid-like organisms or associated with fungal hyphae and mycelia of uncertain affinities, are described from the Devonian strata of the Rhynie chert (United Kingdom) by Krings & Kaštovský (2026).
- Simonet Roda et al. (2026) identify Tubiphytes and Archaeolithoporella from the Permian (Guadalupian) strata in New Mexico (United States) as fossilized remains of microbial mats, most likely constructed by filamentous cyanobacteria.
- Lechte et al. (2026) reconstruct the habitats of the oldest known (approximately 1.75–1.4 billion years old) eukaryotes, find them to be almost entirely restricted to settings with oxygenated bottom waters, interpret early eukaryotes as aerobic organisms that likely had mitochondria, and argue that eukaryotes might have expanded from oxygenated benthic habitats into planktonic habitats later in their evolutionary history, possibly during the Neoproterozoic.
- Vase-shaped microfossils of possible testate amoebae are reported from the 1.56-billion-years-old strata of the Gaoyuzhuang Formation (China) by Liu et al. (2026).
- Evidence from the study of spatial distribution of minerals and organic matter in embryo-like microfossils from the Ediacaran Weng'an phosphorite (Doushantuo Formation, South China), interpreted as consistent with a microbial origin of the studied microfossils, is presented by Lu et al. (2026).
- Phosphatized microfossils with morphological similarities to radiolarians and foraminifera are reported from the Ediacaran Dengying Formation and Cambrian Kuanchuanpu Formation (Shaanxi, China) by Luo et al. (2026).
- Evidence from the study of the fossil record of Tawuia, indicative of its growth from a discoidal Chuaria-like form and supporting its eukaryotic affinities, is presented by Lang et al. (2026).
- Flett et al. (2026) study the developmental biology of Megaclonophycus from the Ediacaran Doushantuo Formation, support the interpretation of Megaclonophycus, Parapandorina and Megasphaera as likely to be the same organism, find no evidence supporting animal affinities of the studied organism, and interpret it as a possible non-choanozoan holozoan.
- Shang, Liu & Zhang (2026) report the discovery of a new acritarch assemblage from the Ediacaran strata of the Kheseen Formation (Mongolia), providing evidence of presence of Doushantuo-Pertatataka–type acritarchs (otherwise predominantly known from pre-Shuram strata) in the horizon recording the Shuram excursion.
- Yang et al. (2026) study the composition of large acanthomorphic acritarchs from the Ediacaran strata of the Shuurgat Formation (Mongolia), reporting evidence of affinities of the studied assemblage with acritarchs from the Yangtze block (China) and Lesser Himalaya (India).
- Agić et al. (2026) report the discovery of a new assemblage of Doushantuo-Pertatataka–type organic-walled microfossils from the Ediacaran strata from the Volta Basin (Ghana), confirming the global distribution of the studied type of microfossils and their stratigraphic significance.
- Qiu et al. (2026) report the discovery of a new assemblage of compression fossils from the Tonian Changlingzi Formation (Liaoning, China), including fossils of members of the genera Chuaria, Tawuia and Protoarenicola.
- Loron et al. (2026) report evidence indicating that fossils of Prototaxites from the Rhynie chert were chemically and structurally distinct from contemporaneous and extant fungi, and interpret Prototaxites as a representative of an extinct eukaryotic lineage distinct from fungi.
- Evidence from the study of Eocene dinoflagellate cyst assemblages from the Ivory Coast–Ghana marginal ridge (equatorial Atlantic Ocean), indicating that the studied assemblages did not undergo significant changes of composition during those early Eocene hyperthermals that did not result in sea surface temperatures rising more than approximately 1.5 °C, is presented by Fokkema et al. (2026) .
- Zhao et al. (2026) link the displacement of green eukaryotic algae by phytoplankton groups whose plastids are derived from rhodophytes as the dominant marine phytoplankton in the early Mesozoic to structural characteristics of red lineage phytoplankton that enhanced their resistance to environmental reactive oxygen species.
- Ying et al. (2026) reconstruct extinction patterns in plankton communities during the Cretaceous–Paleogene extinction event, and interpret the reconstructed extinction patterns as primarily driven by darkness after the Chicxulub impact and by extinction thresholds influenced by body size.
- Smith et al. (2026) study the diversity dynamics of marine plankton during the Cenozoic, and report evidence of reduced extinction risk for autotrophs compared to other trophic groups.
- The first record of Plumalina sp. (an organism of uncertain affinities, possibly related to hydroids or macroalgae) from eastern Europe known to date is reported from the Devonian (Famennian) strata of the Maf-Khaia Formation in the southern Donets Basin by Dernov & Yefimenko (2026).

== History of life in general ==
=== Before Phanerozoic ===
- Lole Durbin et al. (2026) report new microfossils from the strata of the Kheseen Formation (Mongolia) of probable early Cambrian age (lacking confirmed animal remains in spite of being deposited at the time when animals already existed), argue that the Ediacaran Weng'an Biota that also lacks confirmed animal fossils is not a suitable maximum calibration for crown group Metazoa, Eumetazoa or Bilateria in the studies on the timing of origination of these groups (as the lack of animals in both Weng'an and Kheseen biotas might be caused by factors such as taphonomy or ecology), and report that use of even older biotas as maximum calibrations of these groups results in estimates of the timing of the origination of animals during late Tonian to mid-Cryogenian.
- Zhang (2026) presents a new hypothesis on causes of the rise of organismal complexity that made the Cambrian radiation possible in favorable environmental conditions, linking it to predator–prey interactions among unicellular holozoans that drove genomic novelty, and to motility acting as an evolutionary filter, with high-motility forms retaining unicellularity and low-motility ones ultimately evolving multicellularity.
- Zha et al. (2026) report evidence from experimental cultivation and burial of colonies of extant fungi indicating that the studied fungi can develop macroscopic colonies with morphological similarities to discoidal fossils reported from the Francevillian biota and from Ediacaran assemblages, and argue that such discoidal fossils might actually be remains of microbial colonies.
- Evidence from experiments with extant unicellular algae, indicating that evolution of motile multicellular forms might have been an adaptive strategy of unicellular organisms that facilitated their survival in the environment with increased water viscosity during Cryogenian glaciations, is presented by Halling et al. (2026).
- Review of bioerosional ichnotaxa and of changes of diversity of bioerosional trace fossils through time is published by Wilson et al. (2026).
- A new early Ediacaran assemblage, including cyanobacteria, benthic algae, phytoplankton and possible animals, is reported from the Doushantuo Formation (China) by Ye et al. (2026).
- Wang et al. (2026) report the discovery of a new assemblage of late Ediacaran organisms (the Dongpo biota) from the Dongpo Formation (China), expanding known geographic distribution of the Ediacaran macrofossils.
- Kolesnikov et al. (2026) determine precise minimum age of the Ediacaran biota from the Chernyi Kamen Formation in Central Urals (Russia).
- Becker-Kerber et al. (2026) describe new filamentous fossils from the Ediacaran strata of the Tamengo Formation (Brazil), compare their structure to those of purported trace fossils produced by animals from the Ediacaran–Cambrian Corumbá Group reported by Parry et al. (2017), and interpret the studied structures as more likely representing microbial consortia composed of filamentous algae and bacteria rather than animal burrows.
- A new assemblage of Ediacaran fossils, including the first Scandinavian occurrence of Charnia, is described from the Indreelva Member of the Stáhpogieddi Formation (Norway) by Veenma et al. (2026).
- McIlroy et al. (2026) report the discovery of a new fossil site at Inner Meadow (Newfoundland, Canada) determined to be approximately 550.78-million years old and including most the Avalon assemblage biota, and interpret this finding as indicating that the Avalon assemblage and the White Sea assemblage were contemporaneous, and that both were affected by the first pulse of the End-Ediacaran extinction (the Kotlin Crisis).
- Mitchell & Manica (2026) interpret stoloniferous reproduction of members of the Avalon assemblage as a likely cause of low levels of within-species competition seen in the studied communities.
- Evans et al. (2026) report the discovery of a new assemblage of Ediacaran fossils from the Blueflower Formation (Northwest Territories, Canada), representing the first confirmed record of representatives of the White Sea assemblage in Laurentia.
- Li et al. (2026) report the discovery of a new assemblage of late Ediacaran organisms from the strata of the Dengying Formation from the Qingshuigou and Shanglijiao localities (Yunnan, China), preserving remains of Ediacaran macrobionts as well as vermiform animals and the oldest deuterostomes (stem-group ambulacrarians) reported to date.
- Evidence from the study of Ediacaran–Cambrian trace fossils indicative of exponential expansion of sensory ranges of early motile animals by the terminal Ediacaran is presented by Wang & Shi (2026).
- Darroch et al. (2026) review evidence of evolution of new animal ecosystem engineering processes during the Ediacaran–Cambrian transition.
- Guo et al. (2026) report evidence of elevated rates of molecular and phenotypic evolution of animals during the Ediacaran and earliest Cambrian.

=== Phanerozoic ===
- Zhuravlev & Wood (2026) report evidence from the study of the fossil record of Cloudina and earliest Cambrian archaeocyaths indicating that early animals were ecological generalists that were not preferentially associated with reefs, and link the distribution of reefs throughout the evolutionary history of reef-building animals to the presence of suitable environmental conditions and availability of substrates.
- Malanoski et al. (2026) report evidence from the study of the fossil record of shallow-marine taxa, indicating that throughout the Phanerozoic taxa with geographical distribution allowing easier access to north-south dispersal pathways were more resilient compared to taxa living along east-west–oriented coastlines, islands or inland seaways.
- Evidence of long-term northward shifts in marine biodiversity centers throughout the Phanerozoic, interpreted as linked to northward drift of major continental plates, is presented by Zhang & Shen (2026).
- Evidence indicating that presence of bioturbators and reef-building animals was associated with increased biodiversity in marine ecosystems throughout the majority of the Phanerozoic is presented by Cribb, Darroch & Gearty (2026).
- Song et al. (2026) study factors influencing extinction of fusulinoid foraminifera and 11 extinct groups of marine animals, reporting evidence of a slow decline largely independent of environmental factors and of a final, rapid extinction caused by environmental perturbations in all studied groups.
- Guo & Kiessling (2026) report evidence from the study of the fossil record of brachiopods, bivalves and cephalopods indicating that a large proportion of apparent regional generic turnovers reflect range shifts (immigrations and regional extirpations) rather than originations in a region and global extinctions, as well as indicative of stronger impact of changes in the availability of fossil-bearing localities on regional diversity patterns derived from the fossil record compared to global patterns.
- Evidence from the study of the fossil record of marine invertebrates, indicative of impact of Earth's long-term climate state on the strength of the latitudinal diversity gradient throughout the Phanerozoic, is presented by Wen et al. (2026).
- Neubauer & Harzhauser (2026) quantify the geographic coverage of the fossil record of animals from shallow marine environments across the Phanerozoic, and identify time intervals with potential for geographic expansion of the known fossil record, as well as time intervals that are likely approaching saturation of sampling effort.
- Evidence from the study of the fossil record of Cenozoic foraminifera, Cretaceous echinoids, Carboniferous crinoids and Cambrian trilobites using a birth–death-sampling model, indicating that long-lived ancestral species that gave rise to many descendant species over the course of their existence should be common in the fossil record of groups with high levels of preservation, is presented by Parins-Fukuchi (2026).
- Review of the fossil record of Paleozoic and Mesozoic bromalites providing evidence of invertebrates feeding on spores and non-angiosperm pollen is published by Delfosse-Allain, Barreiro & Kustatscher (2026).
- Evidence of frequent mismatches between distribution of modern members of groups of organisms across the of life and their distribution in the fossil record is reviewed by Shipley & Saupe (2026).

==== Paleozoic ====
- Dantes & Nagovitsin (2026) provide a general morphological classification of Cambrian cone-shaped microfossils.
- Kimmig & Bicknell (2026) argue that increased availability of fecal matter might have been a significant factor driving the Cambrian explosion.
- A study on the composition and age of the Serkinskaya faunal complex from the lower Cambrian Kessyusa Formation (Russia), including gnathobase fragments representing some of the oldest known evidence of adaptation of animals to durophagy, is published by Dantes, Nagovitsin & Korsakov (2026).
- Song et al. (2026) study the composition of the small shelly fauna associated with archaeocyath reefs from the Cambrian Xiannüdong Formation (Shaanxi, China), interpreted as indicative of presence of a diverse benthic assemblage with reef-dwelling organisms distinct from those in other reef environments.
- Zeng et al. (2026) report a diverse biota dominated by arthropods, sponges and cnidarians and including soft-bodied forms preserved with cellular tissues (the Huayuan biota) from a Cambrian Stage 4 Burgess Shale-type Lagerstätte from the Yangtze Block (Hunan, China).
- Oh, Park & Peel (2026) study the composition of the assemblage of small shelly fossils from the Cambrian strata from the Aftenstjernesø Formation (Greenland), providing biostratigraphic data for correlations with assemblages from the Cambrian Stage 3–4 transition around the world.
- Gass & Noffke (2026) describe new trace fossils from the Cambrian strata from the Blackberry Hill site (Wisconsin, United States), including trace fossil evidence of an animal feeding on a scyphozoan, and name new ichnotaxa Seilacherichnus and Climactichnites blackberriensis.
- A new assemblage of shallow-marine trace fossils, including burrowing structures assigned to the ichnogenus Psammichnites and interpreted as produced by a short-bodied animal with similarities to molluscs, is described from the Wuliuan strata of the Mantou Formation (Xuzhou, China) by Wang et al. (2026).
- Shi et al. (2026) reconstruct high-resolution patterns of changes of marine biodiversity from Miaolingian to Furongian, reporting evidence of three significant biodiversity pulses and evidence of declines of biodiversity coinciding with carbon isotope excursions.
- Helms et al. (2026) report evidence of variable skeletal fossil abundance in the Lower and Middle Ordovician strata of the Pogonip Group (Nevada, United States), interpreted as influenced by local environmental controls in addition to the Great Ordovician Biodiversification Event.
- Soucy et al. (2026) reconstruct the trophic network of Ordovician organisms from the Fezouata Formation (Morocco), providing evidence of high diversity of taxa at both low and highest trophic levels, as well as high diversity of taxa with generalist diets.
- A new, diverse assemblage of marine invertebrates dating to Darriwilian (the N'kob Biota) is reported from the strata of the Ouine Inirne Formation in central Anti-Atlas (Morocco) by Khardali et al. (2026).
- Evidence from the study of the invertebrate fossil material from the Cincinnati Arch (United States), indicating that the appearance of invasive species during the Late Ordovician (the Richmondian Invasion) resulted in composition of the benthic invertebrate assemblage from the studied area but did not significantly change its functional diversity, is presented by Ess et al. (2026).
- Kundladi & Stigall (2026) study diversification and interaction dynamics of marine invertebrates from the Nashville Basin across the Richmondian Invasion, providing evidence of changes of community structure that negatively impacted some of the native taxa but overall resulted in the emergence of a more stable and complex ecosystem.
- Evidence from the study of the fossil record of Ordovician–Silurian marine invertebrates, indicative of biogeographic homogenization resulting from Late Ordovician mass extinction, as well as of later reestablishment of provinciality of marine invertebrate faunas compared to their taxonomic diversity, is provided by Liu et al. (2026).
- Wang et al. (2026) report evidence of exceptional preservation of animal remains in the fossil record of the Silurian small shelly fauna from the Xiaoxi Formation (China).
- Whitaker & Laflamme (2026) review the composition of the fossil assemblage from the Silurian Eramosa Lagerstätte (Ontario, Canada).
- Cyanobacterial, fungal and algal remains interpreted as record of a Devonian biota inhabiting a highly saline, sulphate lake and associated playa mudflat are described from the Lower Old Red Sandstone) deposits of the Northern Highlands (Scotland, United Kingdom) by Wellman (2026).
- A new Devonian biota, including clam shrimps, scorpions, juvenile eurypterids and possible euthycarcinoids and velvet worms, is reported from a new site in Luxembourg (the Consthum Lagerstätte) by Poschmann et al. (2026).
- Evidence from the study of conodont and carbon isotope stratigraphy from the Devonian strata from southern China and from the worldwide fossil record, indicative of two phases of extinctions of shallow-water faunas during the Taghanic event and a single phase of the Frasnes crisis, is presented by Huang et al. (2026).
- A study on marine fossil assemblages from the Devonian strata in south China, providing evidence of stable functional diversity during Late Devonian extinction events in spite of loss of taxonomic diversity, as well as evidence of more severe losses of diversity in shallow-marine environments than in deeper settings, is published by Huang et al. (2026).
- A study on extinction dynamics during the Late Devonian extinction in the Appalachian Basin, providing evidence that the Upper Kellwasser Event was largely benthic-selective in the studied area, is published by Cohen, Pippenger & Chilcoat (2026).
- Cyrino et al. (2026) identify bilaterian trace fossils purportedly originating from the Ediacaran–Cambrian Bambuí Group as actually originating from the late Paleozoic Floresta Formation (Santa Fé Group, Brazil).
- Evidence of latitudinal and climatic gradients in the diversity of trace fossils dating to the Late Paleozoic icehouse is presented by de Barros et al. (2026).
- Whittingham al. (2026) study the body-mass distributions of tetrapods from Carboniferous (Pennsylvanian) wetland communities from Joggins and Point Aconi (Nova Scotia, Canada), and interpret the observed differences between the studied communities and modern ones from tropical wetlands as possibly caused in part by taphonomic size biases against small organisms and in part by limited dietary diversity of the studied tetrapods.
- Calábková, Březina & Nádaskay (2026) study the composition of a diverse assemblage of tetrapod trace fossils from the Carboniferous (Gzhelian) Semily Formation (Czech Republic).
- Henderson, Angiolini & Beauchamp (2026) study the composition of the Permian (Asselian) fauna from the Strathearn Formation (Nevada, United States) dominated by brachiopods and bryozoans, interpreted as benefiting from intermittent nutrient supply brought in by upwelling, and interpreted as repeatedly recovering after disruptions caused by storm events.
- Marchetti et al. (2026) determine the Permian biota from the Bromacker locality (Tambach Formation, Germany) to be latest Asselian in age.
- A regurgitalite produced by a predator (possibly Dimetrodon teutonis or Tambacarnifex unguifalcatus), preserving remains of Thuringothyris mahlendorffae, Eudibamus cursoris and an unidentified diadectid, is described from the Permian Tambach Formation (Germany) by Rebillard et al. (2026).
- Tooth marks produced by large carnivores, as well as boring likely produced by arthropod larvae, are identified in skeletons of juvenile specimens of Diadectes sp. from the Permian strata of the Vale Formation (Texas, United States) by Young, Maho & Reisz (2026).
- Craig, Davies & Marchetti (2026) describe fossil plants and animal traces from the Permian Cap-aux-Meules Formation (Quebec, Canada), including fossil material of dryland vegetation, tetrapod trackways resembling ichnotaxa characteristic of the late Artinskian-Kungurian Erpetopus biochron, and the earliest vertebrate burrows from aeolian strata reported to date.
- Uliakhin et al. (2026) describe an incomplete postcranial skeleton of a tetrapod (possibly gephyrostegid Nyctiboetus kassini) from the Permian (Guadalupian) strata from the Shikhovo–Chirki locality (Kirov Oblast, Russia) preserved with fossilized contents of the gastrointestinal tract including remains of the ray-finned fish Kazanichthys viatkensis.
- Shipps et al. (2026) provide a new stratigraphic range chart for the Permian vertebrate record from the Usili Formation (Tanzania), and find no evidence supporting recognition of more than one biozone within the studied formation.
- Gastaldo et al. (2026) reevalute evidence of replacement of Permian terrestrial vertebrate assemblages from the Karoo Basin by taxa from the Lystrosaurus declivis Assemblage Zone during the Permian-Triassic transition on the basis of data from localities in and around Wapadsberg Pass (South Africa), and interpret the stratigraphic record from the Wapadsberg Pass area as inconsistent with the model of turnover of vertebrate assemblages that was coeval with the end-Permian marine extinction.
- Marquez et al. (2026) link extinction selectivity during the Permian–Triassic extinction event to differences in physiological tolerances of various organism to climate warming.

==== Mesozoic ====
- Liu et al. (2026) compare the recovery of ostracods, brachiopods and ammonites in the aftermath of the Permian–Triassic extinction event, and find that brachiopods and ammonites refilled the vacated morphospace with limited innovation, while ostracods underwent a adaptive radiation, expanding morphospace and ecological niches.
- A study on the diverse coprolite assemblage from the Lower Triassic Vikinghøgda Formation (Svalbard, Triassic), providing the first evidence of presence of invertebrates (cephalopods and sponges) in the Grippa bonebed and evidence of the coprolite producers feeding on ray-finned fishes and juvenile ichthyopterygians, is published by Simonsen et al. (2026).
- Trace fossil evidence of predation of horseshoe crabs on polychaetes is reported from the Lower Triassic Daye Formation (China) by Feng et al. (2026), who also report evidence indicative of enhanced infaunalization coinciding with diversification of marine predators during the Early Triassic.
- Woolley et al. (2026) describe the first vertebrate assemblage from the middle member of the Fremouw Formation (Antarctica), including capitosaurian, therocephalian, procolophonid and archosauromorph fossil material and interpreted as likely to be Early Triassic in age.
- Casts of burrows likely produced by ground-dwelling crayfish, as well as casts of burrows produced by tetrapods (possibly procolophonids, trirachodontids or bauriids) that might have been feeding on crayfish, are reported from the Middle Triassic Burgersdorp Formation (South Africa) by Wolvaardt et al. (2026).
- Zhang et al. (2026) determine the age and duration of the Ladinian Xingyi Fauna on the basis of the study of astrochronology and cyclostratigraphy of the Nimaigu Section of the Falang Formation (China), and interpret the environment of the studied fauna as driven by a combination of orbital forcing and volcanic activity.
- Trinidad et al. (2026) study the bone histology of Late Triassic vertebrates from the Pebbly Arkose Formation (Zimbabwe), reporting evidence of frequent interrupted growth in rhynchosaurs and suchians as well as evidence of faster and more continuous growth in cynodonts and dinosaurs, and interpret the studied vertebrates as likely living in a more arid resource-poor environment with less seasonal variation compared to their contemporaries from assemblages from Argentina, Brazil and India.
- Apgar, Tomé & Moore (2026) evaluate evidence of ecological relationships between Late Triassic (Adamanian and Revueltian) vertebrates from the Petrified Forest National Park (Arizona, United States).
- Numberger-Thuy et al. (2026) describe fossil material of late-surviving plagiosaurs and a diverse reptile assemblage from the Rhaetian strata of the Exter Formation (Germany).
- Sedorko & Nebelsick (2026) study the composition of the trace fossil assemblage from the Exter Formation, interpreted as consistent with presence of a shallow-marine environment.
- Rosin et al. (2026) study the composition of the palynomorph assemblages from the Westbury, Lilstock and Redcar Mudstone formations in the Cheshire Basin (United Kingdom), recording changes of composition of vegetation and aquatic microorganism assemblages in response to environmental changes during the latest Triassic and Early Jurassic.
- Stone et al. (2026) reconstruct timing and phases of reef recovery in the High Atlas Basin of Morocco in the aftermath of the Toarcian Oceanic Anoxic Event, interpreted as determined by tolerances of different framework builders to environmental conditions at the time.
- Fossil evidence of coral and microbialite reefs that were the earliest reefs reported to date that recovered from the Toarcian Oceanic Anoxic Event is reported from Central High Atlas Mountains (Morocco) by Stone et al. (2026).
- A Bajocian fauna with similarities to faunas of the northern Tethyan margin, dominated by ammonites and including sponges, crinoids, brachiopods, bivalves and belemnites is described from the strata of the Komló Calcareous Marl Formation (Hungary) by Bujtor, Henn & Kanizsai (2026), who link the presence of the fauna in the studied area to the sea level rise during the latest Bajocian.
- Evidence of a host-regulated symbiosis between Protulophila gestroi and the serpulid Propomatoceros lumbricalis from the Middle Jurassic strata from the Polish Basin is presented by Słowiński et al. (2026).
- Guo et al. (2026) report evidence of different ecological tipping points under environmental stress in co-occurrence networks and food webs from the early Yanliao Biota.
- Evidence of Oxfordian age of the trace fossil assemblage from the La Matilde Formation (Argentina), interpreted as fossil record of a pioneer community in a devastated volcanic landscape, is presented by Díaz-Martínez et al. (2026).
- Girmay et al. (2026) study the composition of the assemblage of fossils of benthic invertebrates and trace fossils from the Antalo Limestone (Ethiopia), interpreted as indicative of a marine connection between East Africa and the Middle East during the Late Jurassic.
- Vennari et al. (2026) study the ecology of the marine biota from Vaca Muerta (Argentina), identifying the studied assemblage as a complex, vertically tiered ecosystem that remained functionally stable from the Tithonian to early Valanginian.
- Butt et al. (2026) review the composition of the Jurassic–Cretaceous (Tithonian–Berriasian) tetrapod fauna from the Purbeck Group (United Kingdom).
- Evidence of different changes of diversity and responses to environmental changes in various vertebrate groups in Asia during the Jurassic-Cretaceous transition presented by Yu et al. (2026).
- A study on the composition of the Early Cretaceous (Valanginian) microvertebrate fauna from the Cliff End Bone Bed (Ashdown Formation; United Kingdom) is published by Clavo Yamahuchi et al. (2026).
- García-Cobeña et al. (2026) report the discovery of new fossil material of cartilaginous fishes, turtles, crocodylomorphs and dinosaurs from the Lower Cretaceous El Castellar Formation (Spain), expanding known vertebrate diversity from the studied formation.
- Cortés & Larsson (2026) interpret high diversity and complex structure of the Early Cretaceous marine assemblage from the Paja Formation (Colombia) as likely influenced by both abiotic and biotic drivers.
- Evidence of presence of taxa belonging to middle as well as late Jehol Biota is reported from the Lower Cretaceous strata from the Qinling orogenic belt (China) by Song et al. (2026).
- Zhang et al. (2026) determine the age of the vertebrate assemblage from the Duanjiagou fossil site (Inner Mongolia, China), and report evidence of similarities of the composition and relative abundance of vertebrates from this site and from the Lujiatun Bed of the Yixian Formation in Liaoning.
- Vršanský et al. (2026) report the discovery of a new assemblage of Early Cretaceous organisms preserved in amber from the Nimnica Formation (Slovakia), and classify ambers from hundreds sites worldwide ranging in age from Triassic to present as formed within 7 globally distributed forest types.
- A study on the morphological variability and possible affinities of vertebrate coprolites from the Cretaceous Kem Kem Beds (Morocco) is published by Challin et al. (2026).
- Fiorelli et al. (2026) report discovery of well-preserved fossil material of diverse Late Cretaceous microorganisms encrusted in microbialites from paleogeysers and hot springs from the Sanagasta GeoPark (La Rioja, Argentina).
- A study on the fossil record of non-mammalian vertebrates from the Cretaceous-Paleogene transition of the Ferris Formation (Wyoming, United States) is published by Wroblewski (2026), who places the local Cretaceous-Paleogene boundary 50 m above the previous proposed location, and reports evidence of decrease of recorded diversity of dinosaurs during the latest Maastrichtian that might have either taphonomical or biological causes.

==== Cenozoic ====
- A study on turtle fossils from the Paleocene Santa Lucía Formation (Bolivia), providing evidence of presence of trace fossils resulting from predation or scavenging by crocodyliforms, as well as probable trace fossil evidence of invertebrate parasitism, is published by Wilson et al. (2026).
- Adaci, Bensalah & Tabuce (2026) reconstruct the habitat of the Eocene vertebrate assemblage from the Gour Lazib Complex (Glib Zegdou Formation, Algeria) as a closed tropical forest with meandering watercourses.
- A study on the composition of the Eocene marine assemblage from the Florești site (Romania), indicative of environmental changes through time and presence of a complex food web, is published by Trif et al. (2026).
- Evidence from the study of the fossil record of reef-building corals and of the evolutionary history of reef-associated fishes inferred from molecular phylogenies, indicating that formation of the Great Indo-Australian Miocene Reef System in the Miocene coincided with and likely influenced diversification of corals and reef-associated fish lineages, is presented by Siqueira et al. (2026).
- Vasile et al. (2026) study the composition of the vertebrate assemblage from the Stăuceni site (Romania), including both Pliocene–Pleistocene taxa and reworked Miocene fossils, and including the first Middle Pleistocene small mammal assemblage from the part of Romania east of the Carpathians reported to date.
- Russo et al. (2026) study the composition of Pleistocene faunal assemblages from the Naame, Nahr Ibrahim and Ras el-Kelb sites (Lebanon) and tooth wear of ungulates from these sites, while Russo et al. (2026) study the isotopic composition of tooth enamel of ungulates from the three studied sites; the two studies provide evidence interpreted as indicative of persistence of Mediterranean seasonality and woodland ecosystems in the area of central Levantine coast between 400,000 and 100,000 years ago, resulting in existence of an ecological refugium that supporting diverse ungulate assemblages and enabled distinct, seasonal hominin foraging strategies, and evidence indicative of ecological differentiation between central and southern Levant in the studied time interval.
- Moretti & Young (2026) describe new fossil material of mammals and tortoises from Bender's Cave (Texas, United States), including the first records of Hesperotestudo sp. and Holmesina septentrionalis from the Late Pleistocene of the Edwards Plateau, and argue that the assemblage from Bender's Cave might include animals dating to interglacial intervals of the Late Pleistocene.
- Serdyuk et al. (2026) report the discovery of a new assemblage of vertebrate remains of probable middle Holocene age from the Baskunchak Cave, providing evidence of presence of the yellow steppe lemming in addition to taxa that are extant in the Astrakhan Oblast (Russia).
- Pillay et al. (2026) conduct a survey of ancient DNA from subfossil remains from Nuku Hiva (French Polynesia), identify a wide range of vertebrate taxa on the basis of bulk bone metabarcoding, and report the identification of remains of seabird taxa new to the archaeological record of the Marquesas Islands, including possible record of the sooty shearwater and the flesh-footed shearwater.
- Evidence from the study of approximately 7,000-year-old corals and fish otoliths from coral reef deposits from Panama and the Dominican Republic and from the study of the trophic structure of nearby modern reefs, indicative of reduction of length and complexity of food webs in the Caribbean reef ecosystems throughouth the Holocene, is presented by Lueders-Dumont et al. (2026).
- Evidence from the study of the Neogene to Holocene record of marine anthozoans, bivalves, gastropods, sea urchins, cartilaginous fishes and mammals, indicating that neither absolute range nor range change in isolation is sufficient to predict extinction of members of the studied groups, is presented by Straube et al. (2026).

== Other research ==
- Chaudhuri et al. (2026) report an approximately 3.5-billion-year-old chert with carbonaceous matter from the Singhbhum craton (India), interpreted as the oldest directly dated rock with a confirmed biosignature reported to date.
- Liu et al. (2026) reconstruct marine biogeochemical cycles during the Proterozoic, and find that dense phytoplankton at the surface of the ocean resulting from lack of predators would have prevented sunlight from reaching subsurface layers of the ocean, causing reduction of subsurface net primary productivity.
- Huang & Shen (2026) interpret the redox condition of the Earth surface during the Proterozoic as influenced by the biological pump structure and by changes in the structure of eukaryotic phytoplankton.
- El Khoury et al. (2026) report geochemical data from the Franceville basin (Gabon) indicating that during Paleoproterozoic seawater in the studied area episodically reached nutrient and oxygen levels comparable to those observed in Cambrian oceans.
- Evidence from the Proterozoic Chuanlinggou Formation (China), interpreted as indicative of a prolonged oxygenation of shallow seawater before the appearance of macroscopic eukaryotes in the studied area, is presented by Wang et al. (2026).
- Review of evidence of changes of habitability of marine environments for animals throughout the last billion of years is published by Ashing-Giwa et al. (2026).
- Strullu-Derrien & Rillig (2026) review evidence of development of soil and its biotic components throughout the history of Earth, and argue that the initial development of soils and their biodiversity might be linked to colonization of lands by microorganisms long before the emergence of land plants.
- Fernandes et al. (2026) study the chromium, cadmium and strontium isotope composition of carbonate rocks from the Corumbá Group (Brazil) to reconstruct local environmental conditions during the late Ediacaran, and interpret the extent of habitats suitable for early animals as limited by the extent of oxygenated shallow waters, which in turn was influenced by an intricate interplay of water circulation, redox and productivity.
- Vixseboxse et al. (2026) argue that non-uniform preservation of soft-bodied organisms in the fossil record, including their exceptional Ediacaran-style preservation, might be linked to the origin and changes of proliferation of microbial collagenases.
- Wang et al. (2026) identify Gondwanan continental fragments buried beneath Phanerozoic orogens in southeastern Asia, central Europe and southeastern North America, determine that by approximately 500 million years ago Gondwana was a supercontinent including at least 80% of Earth's total continental mass, and link the assembly and peripheral subduction of this supercontinent to the CO_{2} and H_{2}O fluxes that facilitated the greenhouse climate and the initial radiation of animals during the Cambrian.
- Evidence from the study of chemostratigraphic data from strata of the Dengying Formation (China), linking biodiversity crisis and subsequent shelly fossil radiation during the Ediacaran-Cambrian transition to concurrent changes in marine chemistry, is presented by Wei et al. (2026).
- Lloyd et al. (2026) report evidence from the study of Cambrian igneous sequences in Brazil and Canada indicating that the Cambrian explosion did not coincide with a significant strengthening of Earth's magnetic field, which was diminished during the late Ediacaran and remained weak for tens of millions of years into the Cambrian.
- Altanshagai et al. (2026) resolve the biostratigraphy and age of the small shelly faunas from the Cambrian Bayangol Formation (Mongolia).
- Pas et al. (2026) study the stratigraphy, geochemistry and astrochronology of the lower Cambrian succession at the Tiout section (Morocco), providing a high-resolution chronostratigraphic framework for the late Terreneuvian–early Cambrian Series 2 interval.
- Jamart et al. (2026) determine the locations of the Wuliuan–Drumian and Drumian–Guzhangian stage boundaries and the duration of the Drumian Carbon Isotope Excursion on the basis of the study of Albjära-1 core from the Alum Shale Formation (Sweden).
- Evidence of links between sea-level oscillations and drops in marine benthic species richness during the Steptoean positive carbon isotope excursion is presented by Wang et al. (2026).
- Naugolnykh (2026) used evidence from the study of the fossil record and soils from deposits along the northeastern coast of the Onega Lake (Vologda Oblast, Russia) to present a reconstruction of the Devonian (Frasnian) environment in the studied area.
- A review of the geology and paleontological content in the Permo-Carboniferous basins of the Armorican Massif is published by Gonçalves (2026).
- Strattmann et al. (2026) reconstruct the environmental context of the Permian (possibly Wordian) fossil assemblage from the Barro Alto site (Rio do Rasto Formation, Brazil), reporting evidence of a seasonal variability in lacustrine environment.
- Huang et al. (2026) report evidence from the study of the Emeishan Traps in the Panzhihua region of China indicative of an abrupt decline of strength of Earth's magnetic field in the late Permian, but argue that the recorded drop was not sufficient to contribute to late Permian extinctions through ozone depletion and increase of surface ultraviolet B radiation.
- Bagherpour et al. (2026) report evidence from the study of the Abadeh and Baghuk sections of the Hambast Formation (Iran) indicative of presence of oxygenated shallow water environment (but with episodes of anoxic conditions) in the central Tethys Ocean during the Permian-Triassic transition.
- Herz et al. (2026) reconstruct global-scale redox changes during the Permian-Triassic transition, reporting evidence of a marine deoxygenation during the latest Permian that was restricted to the deep ocean and did not affect shallow-marine environments.
- Buchwald et al. (2026) report evidence from the study molecular fossils from Dolomites (Italy) indicative of greater variability of structure of microbial communities from shallower settings of equatorial western Tethys Ocean during the Permian-Triassic transition compared to deeper ones, and interpret the recorded variability as more likely linked to sea level fluctuations than to deteriorating environmental conditions before the Permian–Triassic extinction event.
- Ruciński et al. (2026) study the taphonomy of the Grippia Bonebed from the Lower Triassic Vikinghøgda Formation (Norway), identifying processes resulting in a concentrated accumulation of vertebrate remains in the studied area.
- Barrenechea et al. (2026) report evidence of higher content of aluminium phosphate–sulphate minerals in the Lower Triassic strata from the equatorial areas compared to strata from higher latitudes, indicative of prolonged or recurrent acidic episodes continental basins near the equator during the Early Triassic, and interpret the acidity conditions in continental environments as contributing to the Smithian–Spathian boundary event and moderated the recovery after the Permian–Triassic extinction event.
- Shen et al. (2026) provide a high-resolution astronomical time scale for environmental changes and biotic recovery in the northwestern margin of subtropical Pangaea during the Early Triassic on the basis of cyclostratigraphic analysis of the Montney Formation (British Columbia, Canada).
- Sun et al. (2026) provide a comprehensive marine carbonate δ^{13}C dataset for the Triassic, and link the eventual stabilization of the global carbon cycle to biogeochemical feedbacks resulting from the establishment of modern-style ecosystems.
- Rytel et al. (2026) reconstruct the taphonomy of the Middle Triassic vertebrate assemblage from the Miedary site (Poland).
- Ruciński et al. (2026) provide new information on the sedimentology, stratigraphy and taphonomy of the Upper Triassic Silves Marl-Carbonate Evaporitic Complex in the upper portion of the Silves Group (Portugal), and report the identification of new fossil-bearing layers yielding vertebrate fossil material.
- Chai et al. (2026) reconstruct major processes of tectonic evolution in the northern part of the Qinghai-Tibetan Plateau (China) during the Late Triassic, providing evidence of high volcanic viscosity approximately 220 million years ago that might have been caused by multiple tectonic events, and report evidence of coeval climate changes, and discuss possible links between the studied tectonic events and environmental changes and extinctions in the Norian.
- Evidence from the study of the geochemical records of the McCarthy Formation from the Grotto Creek site (Alaska, United States), indicative of progressive deoxygenation in eastern Panthalassa that began approximately 8 million years before Central Atlantic magmatic province emplacement and Triassic–Jurassic extinction and coincided by pattern of regional decline of biodiversity of ammonites and global decline of biodiversity of benthic organisms, is presented by McCabe et al. (2026).
- Falzoni et al. (2026) reconstruct the sequence of carbon isotope excursions and biostratigraphic events during the Triassic-Jurassic transition, and anchor them to ammonite biostratigraphy.
- Wu et al. (2026) reconstruct the long-term evolution of the Tethys Ocean during the Mesozoic.
- Zhao et al. (2026) present an astronomical timescale for the Hettangian stage.
- A study on the sedimentology and geochemistry of the strata of the Moltrasio Formation at the Osteno Lagerstätte (Italy) preserving fossils of a diverse Sinemurian marine assemblage assemblage, as well as on the taphonomy of these fossils and on the composition of the assemblage, is published by Franceschi et al. (2026).
- Wang et al. (2026) report evidence of high elevations and complex topography in northeastern Asia resulting from mid–Late Jurassic plate convergence and promoting the emergence of Yanliao Biota, as well as evidence of topographic ruggedness during the Early Cretaceous that expanded the surface area, amplified the available ecological niche space and resulted in diversification of the Jehol Biota.
- Reynolds et al. (2026) provide new carbonate clumped isotope data from belemnite and bivalve fossils from the Sundance Formation, interpreted as indicative of elevated sea-surface temperatures in the Sundance Sea compared to the open ocean during the Oxfordian, reaching temperatures similar to those of warmest modern tropical seas, a.
- Evidence of impact of emissions of toxic gases resulting from volcanic eruptions on Mesozoic biotas from northern China, including possible disruption of those biotas by substantial emissions and possible support for the development of those biotas from limited volcanic activity, is presented by Wang et al. (2026).
- Rey et al. (2026) study the elemental variability of vertebrate coprolites from the Angeac-Charente bonebed (France), providing evidence that the chemical composition of the studied coprolites was affected by burial environment to a greater degree than by diets of the producers.
- Evidence from the study of sediments and trace fossils from the Lower Cretaceous Três Barras Formation (Sanfranciscana Basin, Brazil), indicative of marine incursions during the Early Cretaceous that were long enough to support benthic colonization of the substrate in probable estuarine setting, is presented by Sedorko (2026).
- Lu et al. (2026) report evidence of asynchronous carbon isotope excursions associated with Oceanic Anoxic Event 1a in terrestrial and marine systems, and question the proposal to place the boundary between Barremian and Aptian at the base of the studied oceanic anoxic event.
- Antonietto et al. (2026) identify the strata of the Lower Cretaceous Romualdo Formation (Brazil) as deposited in estuarine bay environments identifiable as mangrove forest-analogues, and interpret the presence of marine fishes in the strata of the studied formation as related to presence of their seasonal breeding grounds in the studied area.
- Review of research on the origin of the El Soplao amber (Las Peñosas Formation; Spain), the Early Cretaceous biota preserved in this amber and the ecology of this biota is published by Sánchez-García et al. (2026).
- Evidence from the study of an ammonite fossil from the Upper Cretaceous (Coniacian-Santonian) Galembo Formation (Colombia), indicative of utility of fibrous marine cements preserved within chambers of ammonite shells for reconstructions of timing of oceanic anoxic events, is presented by Gamarra-Caicedo et al. (2026).
- Buryak et al. (2026) study two exploration drill cores from the Wombat pipe locality in the Lac de Gras kimberlite field (Northwest Territories, Canada), providing information on the climate and environment in the subarctic Canada during the Late Cretaceous, and interpret the sedimentary organic matter from the studied drill cores as derived from C_{3} land plants and, to a lesser degree, algae.
- Fanti et al. (2026) identify the Late Cretaceous (Campanian) fossil assemblage from the Villaggio del Pescatore site (Italy) as living in a tidal flat ecosystem repeatedly affected by tropical cyclones and flood events.
- Landman et al. (2026) reconstruct the environment of deposition of the Pierre Shale on the Cedar Creek Anticline (Montana, United States) spanning the Campanian-Maastrichtian boundary on the basis of the study of geochemical and sedimentological evidence and on the basis of the composition of the fauna.
- Bettermann et al. (2026) report evidence of wider distribution of bioerosional traces on bones from the Upper Cretaceous Haţeg Basin (Romania) than indicated by earlier studies, and interpret their findings as indicative of similar modes of carcass decomposition in the studied area during the Maastrichtian.
- Roberts et al. (2026) study the stratigraphy and age of the strata of the Hell Creek Formation from the excavation site of the "Dueling Dinosaurs", from other locations on the Murray Ranch and from the McGinnis Butte section (Montana, United States), determine the minimum age of approximately 67.102 million years for the base of the Hell Creek Formation in the study area, and determine the age of the "Dueling Dinosaurs" locality to be approximately 66.895 million years.
- Liu et al. (2026) present sedimentological and geophysical evidence indicative of multilayered oceanic circulation and high productivity in the Arctic Ocean during the Late Cretaceous.
- Evidence from the study of spores, pollen and microcharcoal abundances from Paleogene sediments from a hydrothermal vent crater in the North Atlantic Igneous Province on the Norwegian Margin and from other mid- and high latitude continental margins, indicative of rapid vegetation and soil disturbances in response to environmental changes at the onset of the Paleocene–Eocene thermal maximum resulting in widespread appearance of fern-dominated pioneer vegetation across mid- and high-latitude regions of the world, is presented by Nelissen et al. (2026).
- Xia, Wu & Li (2026) interpret elemental distribution in fossils of Eocene penguins from the La Meseta and Submeseta formations (Seymour Island, Antarctica) as providing evidence of changes of weathering intensity, depositional energy and redox conditions in Antarctica related to shift from a warm climate during early Eocene to subsequent cooling during middle-late Eocene.
- Evidence of Priabonian age of Baltic amber from the Sambia Peninsula (Kaliningrad Oblast, Russia) is presented by Ross, Bojarski & Szwedo (2026).
- Evidence interpreted as confirming a Miocene rather than Cretaceous age of the Ethiopian amber is provided by Bouju et al. (2026).
- Zou et al. (2026) propose a new model of uptake of rare-earth elements and yttrium into fossil teeth on the basis of study of fish teeth from Oligocene-Miocene sediments along the North Pacific pathway of the Antarctic bottom water, interpret the outer dense layer and the inner porous dentin of the studied teeth as distinct paleoenvironmental archives (with the former's isotopic compositions providing information on the living environment of the fish, and the latter providing information on depositional environment of the studied teeth), and interpret accumulations of fossil teeth in downstream oceanic basins as likely resulting from their transport by bottom currents.
- Munyaka et al. (2026) refine the age of the Miocene Nyakach Formation (Kenya) and reconstruct the environment of Victoriapithecus macinnesi and associated vertebrate faunas from the studied formation as a seasonally wet forest-dominated ecosystem.
- Lukens et al. (2026) reconstruct the environment of the vertebrate (including primate) assemblage from the Buluk Member of the Bakate Formation (Kenya), reporting evidence of a wetter (but not hotter) environment in the Turkana Basin during the Miocene compared to present day, and determine that the vertebrate assemblage dates to the onset of the Middle Miocene Climatic Optimum.
- Bolós et al. (2026) determine the fossils from the Camp dels Ninots maar-lake succession (Spain) to be approximately 4.42 million years old (1.32 million years older than indicated by earlier estimates), and interpret palynological and vertebrate assemblages from the studied site as indicative of warm and humid conditions and of a shift toward forested environments linked to the Early Pliocene Warmth.
- Öğretmen et al. (2026) provide new information on the age of marine deposits exposed on land in Latakia (Syria) on the basis of foraminiferal, nannofossil and palynological data, providing evidence that the shoreline of the easternmost Mediterranean was approximately 15 km inland during the Early Pleistocene, evidence that the coastal strip of the Levantine Corridor was not available for hominin migrations before 1.28 million years ago, and evidence of Mediterranean climate during the Calabrian.
- Evidence from the study of pore-ice isotopes, plant and invertebrate remains and sedimentary ancient DNA from the late Pleistocene Mint Gulch site (Yukon, Canada), indicative of local persistence of steppe-tundra in spite of a regional hydroclimate change beginning approximately 14,000 calibrated years before present, is presented by Cocker et al. (2026).
- Murchie et al. (2026) report evidence of preservation of ancient environmental DNA of diverse Quaternary organisms from eastern Beringia in the Pleistocene and Holocene ground squirrel coprolites from Yukon (Canada).
- The first molecular evidence of HPV16 in ancient anatomically modern humans is reported from the study of ancient DNA of the Ust'-Ishim man and Ötzi by Yazigi et al. (2026).
- Chiappone et al. (2026) determine factors influencing transport of bones in unsteady flows, including their travel distance and transport groups, on the basis of experiments with bones of modern sheep and models of bones of Eolambia caroljonesa and Edmontosaurus regalis.
- Siviero et al. (2026) report evidence from the study of bones of Edmontosaurus annectens from the Cretaceous Lance Formation (Wyoming, United States) indicating that fossil bone abnormalities resulting from postmortem taphonomic processes can be superficially similar to pathologies resulting from disease, and recommend testing diagnoses based on purported fossil bone pathologies with histological analysis.
- Bojarski, Cierocka & Szwedo (2026) revise the diversity and taphonomy of trace fossils preserved within the matrix of fossil resins.
- Evidence from range of motion analyses of joints of extant helmeted guinea fowl, indicating that results of ROM analyses used to determine range of motion of joints of extinct vertebrates are sensitive to variation during the initial positioning of bones into a starting pose, is presented by Lowes et al. (2026).
- DeHaan, Slater & Friedman (2026) report evidence from experiments with a dataset of carangarian fishes indicative of utility of a posteriori insertion of fossils in the phylogenetic studies for improvement of inferences about rates of phenotypic evolution.
- Van Hinsbergen et al. (2026) provide a new upgrade of the online calculator Paleolatitude.org used for estimates of paleolatitude for any location on Earth through time.
- Tonarová et al. (2026) provide evidence of utility of X-ray computed tomography and photogrammetry for 3D imaging of microfossils.
- Evidence of utility of wavelength dispersive spectrometry for the study of morphology of soft-bodied fossils is provided by Lee et al. (2026).

=== Extinction events ===
- Stewart, Diamond & Allman (2026) identify sulfur emissions from contact metamorphism during emplacement of large igneous provinces as a likely driver of global cooling during Phanerozoic mass extinctions.
- Chen et al. (2026) report evidence from geochemical analyses of Ordovician-Silurian strata from the western Yangtze Block (China) interpreted as indicative of impact of intense and sustained volcanism on the Late Ordovician mass extinction.
- Evidence from the study of zinc isotope data from the Chattanooga Shale (Tennessee, United States), linking marine euxinia during the Late Devonian mass extinctions to increased marine productivity, is presented by Li et al. (2026).
- Evidence from the Chattanooga Shale in the southeastern United States indicating that massive wildfires did not trigger marine anoxia during the Late Devonian mass extinctions but rather were its consequence is presented by Lu et al. (2026).
- Edwards, Hibner & Smith (2026) study the extent of marine anoxia during the Frasnian-Famennian transition on the basis of data from strata from the Great Basin region of western United States, and argue that, although marine anoxia expanded during the Late Devonian, it might not have been as significant factor in the decline of biodiversity during the Late Devonian mass extinctions as suggested by earlier studies.
- Review of evidence supporting the interpretation of cataclysmic volcanism as the most likely primary cause of the Late Devonian mass extinctions is published by Racki & Pisarzowska (2026).
- Evidence linking two stages of the Capitanian mass extinction event to two pulses of eruptive activity of the Emeishan Traps is presented by Wei, Zhang & Qiu (2026).
- Evidence from the study of the Fengshan section in southern China, indicative of a geomagnetic instability temporally correlated with and possibly linked to the Capitanian mass extinction event is presented by Zhang et al. (2026).
- Lu et al. (2026) provide a chronostratigraphic framework for the Permian–Triassic transition in northern China on the basis of the study of strata of Upper Shihhotse, Sunjiagou and Liujiagou formations at the Sigou section, reporting evidence of a synchronous zenith of the Permian–Triassic extinction event in marine and low–middle latitude terrestrial settings.
- Wei et al. (2026) report evidence of decrease of global continental weatherability following the Permian–Triassic extinction event, interpreted as likely linked to deforestation resulting from the extinction, and interpreted as contributing to greenhouse conditions and delayed ecosystem recovery in the aftermath of the extinction.
- Evidence linking major episodes of marine large igneous provinces to at least four extinctions of marine biota during the Triassic is presented by Fan et al. (2026).
- Fang et al. (2026) report evidence of acid rains coinciding with the Central Atlantic magmatic province volcanism during the Triassic-Jurassic transition, as well as evidence of critical destruction of plant biomass in terrestrial basins during the Triassic–Jurassic extinction that was likely linked to acid rains.
- Chen et al. (2026) report evidence from chemostratigraphic and astrochronological analysis of a drill core from the Kunming Basin (Yunnan, China) indicative of negative carbon isotope excursions mirroring disturbances in the global carbon cycle during the Triassic-Jurassic transition, and indicative impact of both Central Atlantic magmatic province and regional factors on environmental disruption on the studied area at the Triassic-Jurassic boundary; the authors also determine the oldest sauropodomorph dinosaur fossils from the Kunming Basin to be 200.17-million-years-old, and interpret this result as evidence of colonization of low palaeolatitude area of southwest China by medium- to large-bodied dinosaurs in the aftermath of the Triassic–Jurassic extinction.
- He et al. (2026) reconstruct water-column redox conditions in the western Tethys Ocean at the time of the Triassic–Jurassic extinction based on data from the Cleveland and Cheshire basins, finding no evidence of a pervasive marine anoxia during the first extinction pulse, and interpret the two phases of the studied mass extinction as affected by different environmental mechanisms.
- Evidence of earthquakes and seismically-induced deformations triggered by the Chicxulub impact is reported from the strata from the Cretaceous-Paleogene transition from Colombia and Mexico by Bermúdez et al. (2026).
- The first record of soft-sediment deformation structures from Cuba that were caused by the Chicxulub impact, affecting deep marine deposits and causing sediment remobilization, is reported from the Peñas Formation by Rojas Consuegra et al. (2026).
- Bartali et al. (2026) report evidence of preservation of a high-resolution record of the Chicxulub impact in the strata from the Cretaceous-Paleogene transition from the Rayon reef boundary section from the Valles-San Luis Potosi platform across the Gulf of Mexico.
- Kaiho et al. (2026) report evidence from the study of marine sedimentary rocks from Cretaceous-Paleogene boundary sections in Haiti and Spain indicative of two peaks of mercury enrichments of the studied sediments (the first one likely linked to Deccan Traps volcanism shortly before the Chicxulub impact, the second one linked to the impact itself), and indicating that extinction of Cretaceous planktonic foraminifera coincided with the Chicxulub impact.
- Ota et al. (2026) identify changes in osmium concentrations and osmium isotope ratio of sediments from the Kawaruppu section of the Nemuro Group (Hokkaido, Japan), and interpret the observed variation as likely linked to the supply of meteoritic osmium from the Chicxulub impact.
- Makhatadze et al. (2026) report evidence from the study of nickel isotope signatures in marine clays from Cretaceous-Paleogene boundary sections in Denmark, Italy and Spain, interpreted as indicating that the Chicxulub impactor was a CO-like carbonaceous chondrite, with lower abundances of volatile elements compared to typical carbonaceous chondrites.
- Evidence indicating that the vapor plume from the Chicxulub impact eventually condensed into globally distributed fine dust that enhanced intense heating and widespread fires caused by the impact is presented by Johnson et al. (2026).
- Pickersgill et al. (2026) report evidence of persistence of hydrothermal activity at the Chicxulub impact structure for at least 8 million years after the Cretaceous-Paleogene extinction, representing the longest duration of an impact-generated hydrothermal system on Earth known to date.
- Mari et al. (2026) use data from the study of the Elles I section (Tunisia) to determine the astrochronological age of the Cretaceous–Paleogene extinction event, and report evidence of rapid climate variability in the aftermath of the extinction.
- Evidence from experiments with simulated phylogenetic trees generated under a fossilized birth–death model accounting for speciation, extinction and fossil sampling, indicative of utility of deep learning model for detection of mass extinctions under the conditions defined for the study, is presented by Du et al. (2026).

=== Paleoclimate ===
- Evidence of coupling between climate changes and changes in the biosphere during the Ediacaran is presented by Wong Hearing et al. (2026).
- A study on Earth's climate during the Phanerozoic, supporting the identification of five successive, long-lived climate states that together spanned the majority of the eon, is published by Sudakow et al. (2026), who also report evidence of increased vulnerability of the biosphere to extinctions during the transitions between the identified climate states.
- Zheng et al. (2026) provide a reconstruction of Phanerozoic paleotemperatures that is independent from oxygen isotope ratios, reporting evidence of global temperatures remaining within the 10-30 °C range throughout the Phanerozoic, and finding no evidence of anomalously hot Paleozoic oceans compared to Mesozoic and Cenozoic ones.
- Evidence from the study of Paleozoic storm deposits and from climate simulations, indicative of widespread presence of storm deposits in tropical regions resulting from persistent tropical cyclone activity during the Late Paleozoic icehouse, as well as indicative of poleward shift of this activity during glacial-interglacial transitions, is presented by Yan et al. (2026).
- Myrow, Hu & Lamb (2026) report evidence from the study of storm deposits from the Fountain and Minturn formations (Colorado, United States) indicative of large waves and large cyclonic storms irreconcilable with climate reconstructions suggestive of cold equatorial climate during the middle Pennsylvanian.
- Yao et al. (2026) document evidence of a transient warming event during the Late Paleozoic icehouse happening during the Kasimovian–Gzhelian transition, likely caused by volcanic activity and associated with photic zone euxinia and a crisis of marine life.
- Evidence indicative of decrease of atmospheric CO_{2} during the early and main flood basalt phases of the Emeishan Large Igneous Province emplacement followed by its increase during silicic eruptions, and indicating that environmental impact of Emeishan volcanism began before the main eruptive phase, is presented by Shen et al. (2026).
- Leonard et al. (2026) reconstruct global temperatures since the Late Triassic on the basis of the study of the distribution of corals preserved in the fossil record, and interpret their findings as inconsistent with extreme temperatures during Cretaceous hothouses.
- Evidence from the study of the paleoclimatic data from a Late Triassic sequence in the Zigui Basin (China), indicative of a delayed onset of humidification in the South China Block (postdating the Carnian pluvial episode) relative to the North China Block rather than a uniform climate change during the Triassic, is presented by Yi et al. (2026).
- Mao et al. (2026) study the elevation of the Central Asian Orogenic Belt during the Late Triassic, and report evidence of an uplift resulting from collision of the Tarim, European, and Siberian cratons resulting in mountain glaciation, global cooling, intensification of the monsoon system of Pangaea and disruption of regional ecosystem stability.
- Chen et al. (2026) report evidence linking the global warming during the Toarcian Oceanic Anoxic Event to a massive release of magmatic carbon, interpret as consistent with linking the Toarcian extinction event to the Karoo-Ferrar Large Igneous Provinces volcanism.
- Price, Davies & Cox (2026) present long-term carbon and oxygen isotope records from Jurassic to Early Cretaceous sediments from the Deep Sea Drilling Project Site 534A in the central Atlantic Ocean, including records of warming events in the Middle Jurassic (Bathonian to Callovian), and in the Early Cretaceous (Valanginian).
- Fang et al. (2026) report evidence indicating that the land biosphere acted as a net carbon source during the onset and peak of the Paleocene–Eocene thermal maximum, and interpret the event as primarily caused by North Atlantic Igneous Province volcanism and amplified by carbon release from terrestrial or subsurface reservoirs.
- Shen et al. (2026) interpret the long-term climate cooling during the Cenozoic as likely promoted by uplift of Eastern Tibet during the late Eocene.
- Evidence from the study of the Tuotuohe Basin in central northern Tibetan Plateau indicative of a shift from warm and dry to cool and wet climate in the studied area following the Eocene-Oligocene transition is presented by Li et al. (2026).
- Evidence linking late Miocene global cooling and northern Tibetan Plateau uplift to near-synchronous monsoon intensification and turnover of mammalian communities in Asia approximately 8.7 million years ago is presented by Han et al. (2026).
- Evidence indicating that the Youngest Toba eruption did not cause significant climatic or environmental perturbations in eastern Africa, and likely did not significantly affect contemporary human populations, is presented by Park et al. (2026).
- Burgener, Griffith & Hyland (2026) report evidence from the study of modern topography and land cover data indicating that differences between reconstructions of past mean annual ranges in temperature based on paleobotanical and geochemical proxies are at least partly explained by differences in fossil leaf and soil carbonate land cover types, and interpret most proxies as likely recording true local signals of temperature within larger regions with variable temperatures.
- Evidence indicating that reconstructions of past tropical climate variability based on the study of geochemical tracers measured in corals may be affected by a non-climate noise component inflating the variance of reconstructed temperature is presented by Dolman et al. (2026).
