= Shire of Alexandra =

Coordinates: 37°12′S 145°43′E

- Local government area
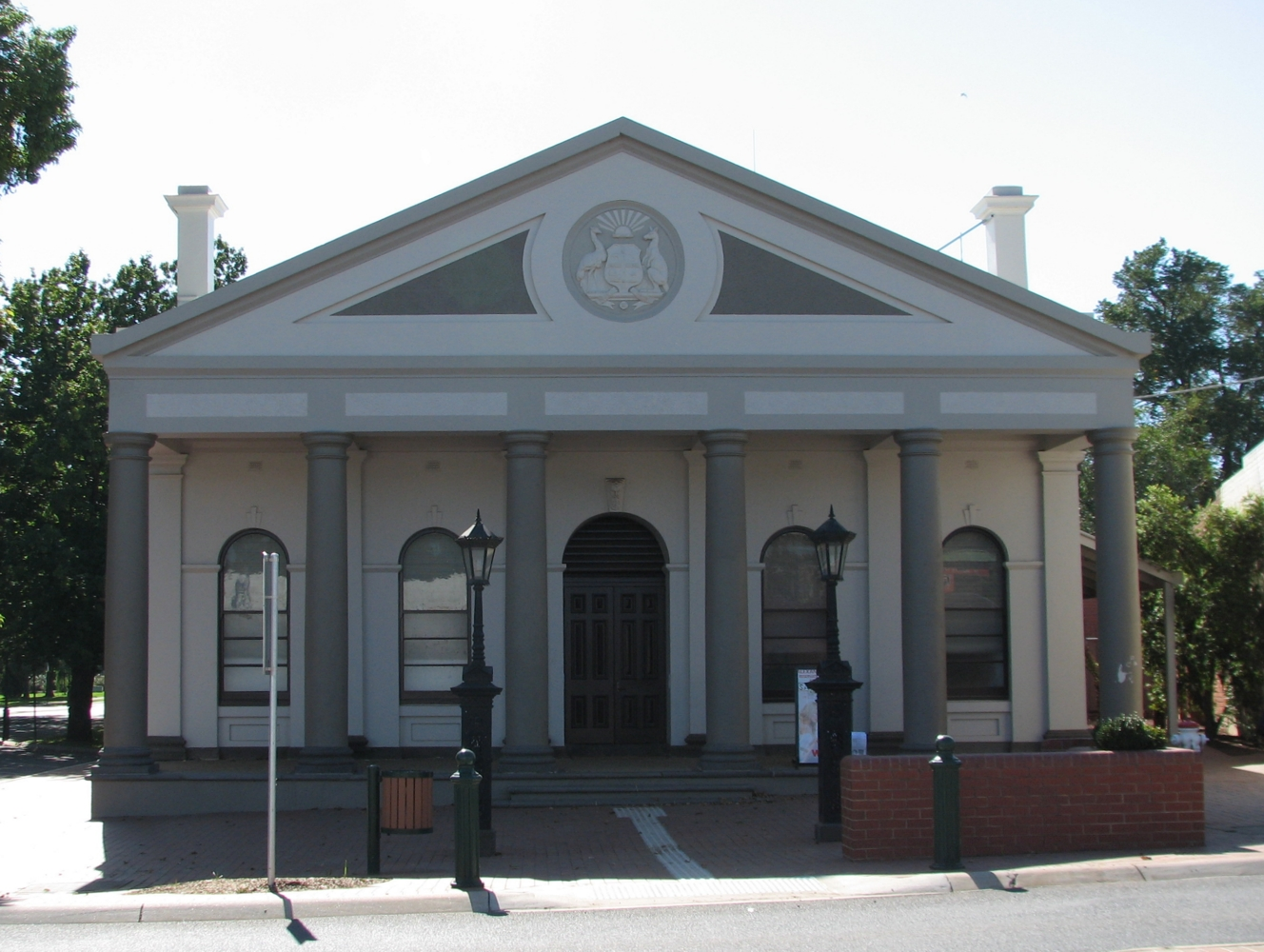
- Alexandra Shire Hall
- The Shire of Alexandra as at its dissolution in 1994
- Country: Australia
- State: Victoria
- Region: Hume
- Established: 1868
- Council seat: Alexandra

Area
  - Total: 2,197.31 km^{2} (848.39 sq mi)

Population
  - Total: 6,120 (1992)
  - Density: 2.7852/km^{2} (7.214/sq mi)
- County: Anglesey, Evelyn
LGAs around Shire of Alexandra
Euroa	Euroa	Mansfield
Yea	Shire of Alexandra	Mansfield
Healesville	Upper Yarra	Upper Yarra

The Shire of Alexandra was a local government area located about 130 kilometres (81 mi) northeast of Melbourne, the state capital of Victoria, Australia. The shire covered an area of 2,197.31 square kilometres (848.4 sq mi), and existed from 1868 until 1994.

== History ==
Alexandra was first incorporated as a road district on 30 June 1868, and became a shire on 3 September 1869. Its boundaries changed a number of times throughout its existence:

- 20 May 1914 - annexed part of the North Riding of the Shire of Yea;
- 1 October 1963 - part of the shire annexed to the Shire of Euroa;
- 1 October 1963 - annexed part of the Shire of Healesville, around Buxton;
- 1 October 1984 - annexed the East Riding of the Shire of Healesville, around Marysville;

On 18 November 1994, the Shire of Alexandra was abolished, and along with the Shire of Yea and parts of the City of Whittlesea and the Shires of Broadford, Eltham, Euroa and Healesville, was merged into the newly created Shire of Murrindindi.

== Wards ==
The Shire of Alexandra was divided into three ridings on 3 August 1985, each of which elected three councillors. Prior to this, it was divided into five ridings in May 1957.

- Central Riding
- North East Riding
- South Riding

== Towns and localities ==
- Acheron
- Alexandra*
- Buxton (transferred from the Shire of Healesville in 1963)
- Cathkin
- Eildon
- Fawcett
- Gobur
- Kanumbra
- Koriella
- Marysville (transferred from the Shire of Healesville in 1984)
- Narbethong (transferred from the Shire of Healesville in 1984)
- Rubicon
- St Filians
- Snobs Creek
- Taggerty
- Thornton
- Yarck

* Council seat.

== Population ==
Year	Population
1911	2,717
1954	6,523
1958	5,440*
1961	4,591
1966	4,485
1971	4,480
1976	4,238
1981	4,376
1986	5,353
1991	5,999

* Estimate in the 1958 Victorian Year Book.
