= Shire of Kilmore =

Coordinates: 37°17′S 144°57′E

- Local government area
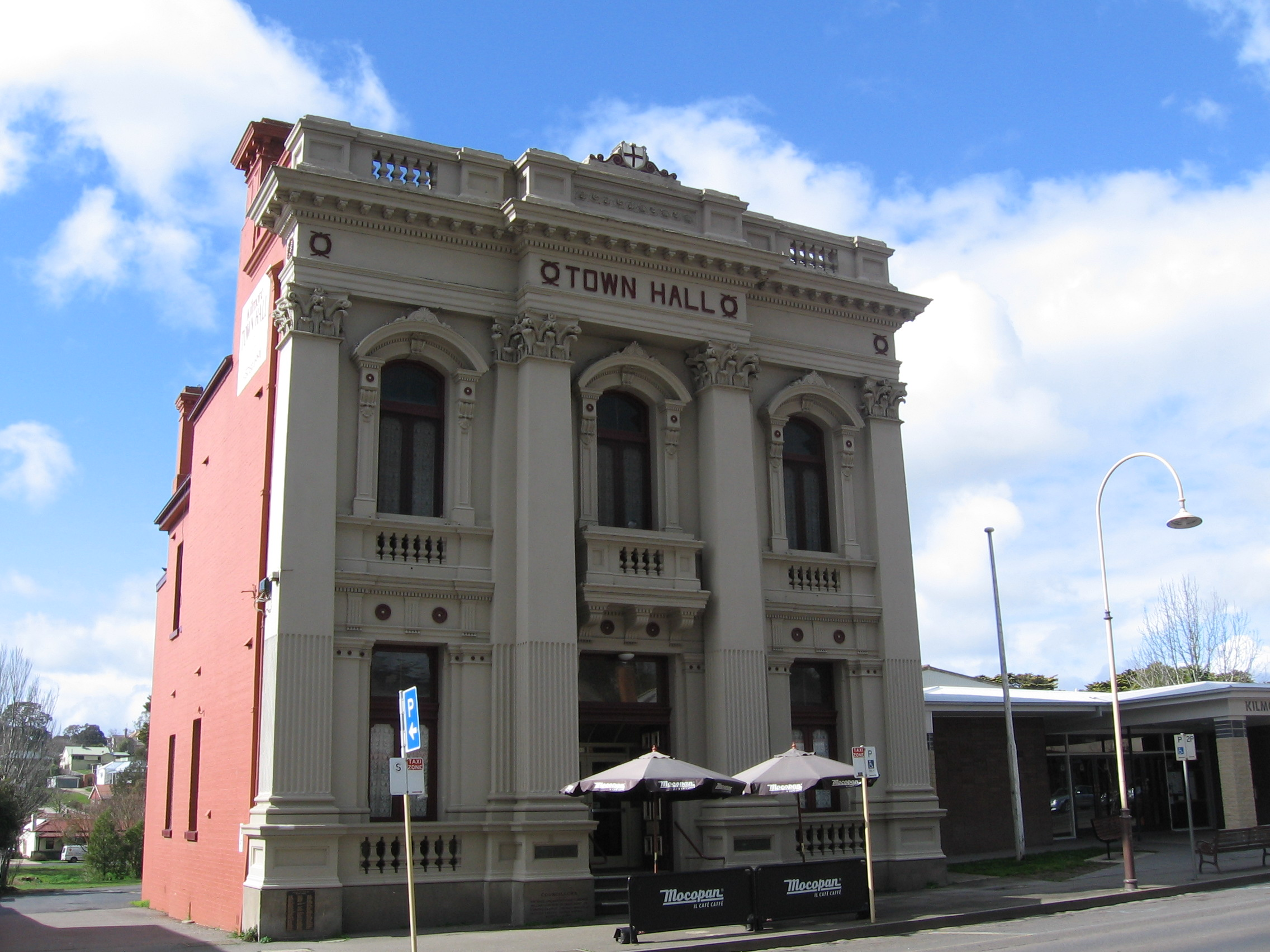
- Kilmore Town Hall

- The Shire of Kilmore as at its dissolution in 1995
- Country: Australia
- State: Victoria
- Region: Hume
- Established: 1856
- Council seat: Kilmore

Area
  - Total: 508.9 km^{2} (196.5 sq mi)

Population
  - Total(s): 9,380 (1992)
  - Density: 18.432/km^{2} (47.738/sq mi)
- County: Bourke, Dalhousie
LGAs around Shire of Kilmore
| Pyalong | Pyalong | Seymour |
| Romsey | Shire of Kilmore | Broadford |
| Bulla | Bulla | Whittlesea |

The Shire of Kilmore was a local government area about 60 kilometres (37 mi) north of Melbourne, the state capital of Victoria, Australia. The shire covered an area of 508.9 square kilometres (196.5 sq mi), and existed from 1856 until 1995.

== History ==
Kilmore was first incorporated as a road district on 15 July 1856. It became a borough in 1863 and a shire on 24 December 1874. It was redefined on 1 October 1890. On 28 May 1958, it annexed parts of the Shire of Romsey.

On 20 January 1995, the Shire of Kilmore was abolished, and was merged into the Shire of Mitchell, which was created earlier in November 1994 after the merger of the Rural City of Seymour, the Shires of Broadford and Pyalong, and parts of the Shire of McIvor.

== Wards ==
The Shire of Kilmore was divided into four ridings, each of which elected three councillors:

- Wallan Riding
- Bylands & Glenburnie Riding
- Willowmavin & Moranding Riding
- Kilmore Riding

== Towns and localities ==
- Beveridge
- Bylands
- Heathcote Junction
- Kilmore*
- Wallan
- Wandong
- Willowmavin

* Council seat.

== Population ==
| Year | Population |
|---|---|
| 1954 | 1,932 |
| 1958 | 2,369* |
| 1961 | 2,728 |
| 1966 | 2,739 |
| 1971 | 2,798 |
| 1976 | 3,660 |
| 1981 | 4,919 |
| 1986 | 6,724 |
| 1991 | 8,827 |

* Estimate in the 1958 Victorian Year Book.
