= Shire of Yea =

Coordinates: 37°12′S 145°25′E

- Local government area
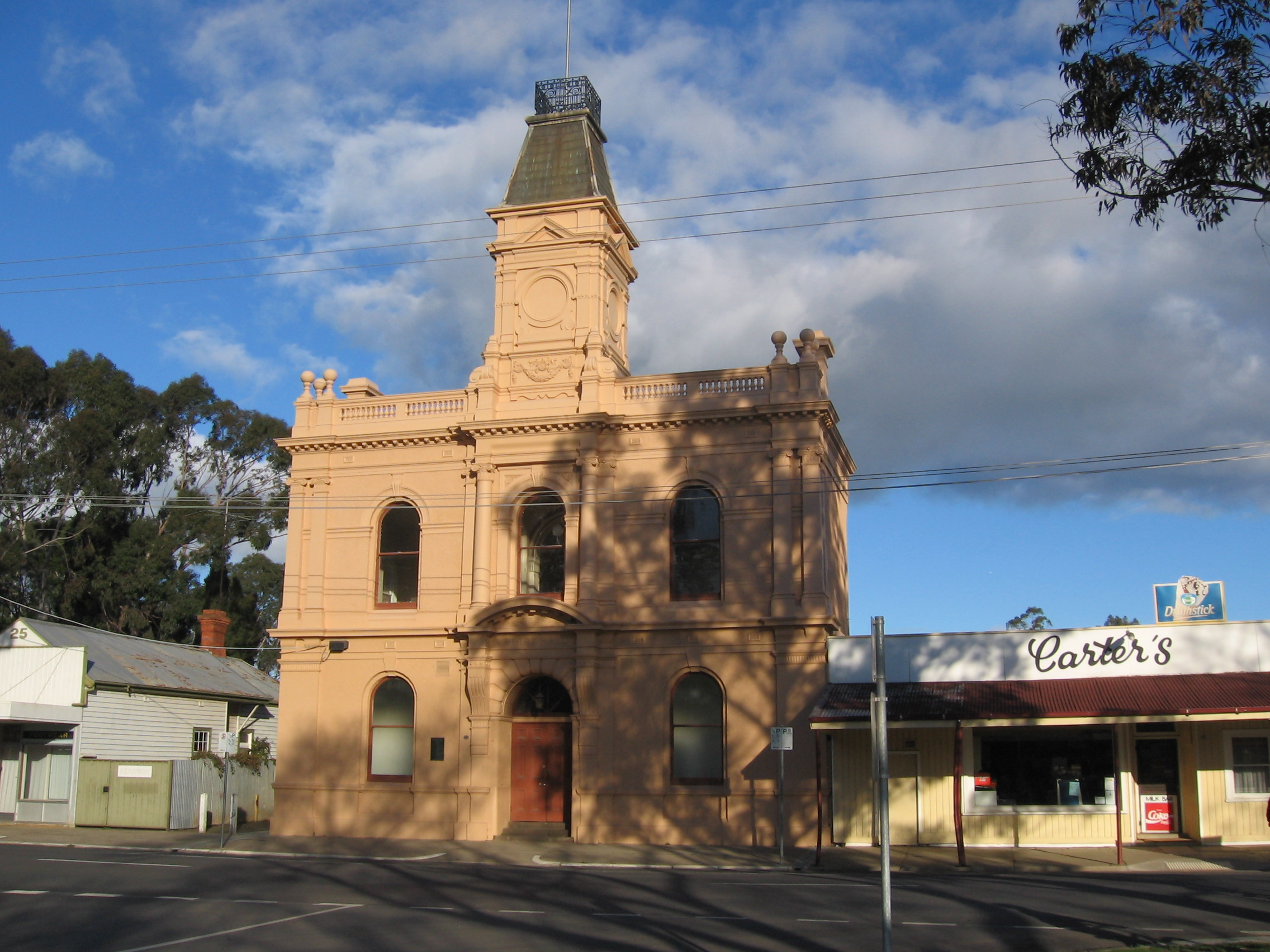
- Yea Shire Hall in High St, Yea
- The Shire of Yea as at its dissolution in 1994
- Country: Australia
- State: Victoria
- Region: Hume
- Established: 1869
- Council seat: Yea

Area
  - Total: 1,392.32 km^{2} (537.58 sq mi)

Population
  - Total(s): 5,030 (1992)
  - Density: 3.613/km^{2} (9.357/sq mi)
- County: Anglesey
LGAs around Shire of Yea
Seymour	Goulburn	Euroa
Broadford	Shire of Yea	Alexandra
Whittlesea	Eltham	Healesville

The Shire of Yea was a local government area about 110 kilometres (68 mi) northeast of Melbourne, the state capital of Victoria, Australia. The shire covered an area of 1,392.32 square kilometres (537.6 sq mi), and existed from 1869 until 1994. The shire's population was dominated by the town of Yea.

== History ==
Yea was first incorporated as a road district on 1 February 1869, and became a shire on 28 November 1873.

Its boundaries changed a number of times throughout its existence:

- 15 May 1907 - Annexed parts of the Shire of Seymour.
- 20 May 1914 - Lost a part of North Riding to the Shire of Alexandra.
- 21 April 1925 - Lost parts to the Shire of Healesville.
- 19 April 1961 - Lost parts to the Shire of Seymour.
- 1 October 1972 - Annexed parts of the Shire of Eltham, near Kinglake.
- 1 October 1980 - Annexed parts of the Shire of Healesville.

The Shire was described in the 1949 Australian Blue Book as an elevated area given to pastoral and dairying pursuits, along with sheep and cattle grazing. By 1994, 51% of Yea's land was under cultivation as farmland, with the Kinglake National Park and Yea River Regional Park, as well as the Murrindindi Forest, the latter being important to Yea's economy for timber production, accounting for much of the rest.

On 18 November 1994, the Shire of Yea was abolished, and along with the Shire of Alexandra and parts of the City of Whittlesea and the Shires of Broadford, Eltham, Euroa and Healesville, was merged into the newly created Shire of Murrindindi.

=== Ridings ===
Yea's ridings were abolished on 27 May 1930, and all councillors represented the entire shire.

== Towns and localities ==
- Break O'Day
- Caveat
- Cheviot
- Devlins Bridge
- Dropmore
- Flowerdale
- Ghin Ghin
- Glenburn
- Hazeldene
- Highlands
- Homewood
- Kerrisdale
- Kinglake (shared with the Shire of Eltham)
- Limestone
- Molesworth
- Murrindindi
- Woodbourne
- Yea*

* Council seat.

== Population ==
Year	Population
1911	2,603
1954	2,866
1958	2,920*
1961	2,697
1966	2,620
1971	2,970
1976	3,071
1981	4,437
1986	4,200
1991	4,744

* Estimate in the 1958 Victorian Year Book.
