= Shire of Broadford =

Coordinates: 37°12′S 145°04′E

Shire of Broadford Victoria
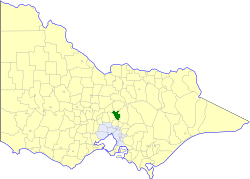
- Location in Victoria
- The Shire of Broadford as at its dissolution in 1994
- Population: 4,310 (1992)
  - Density: 7.479/km^{2} (19.370/sq mi)
- Established: 1869
- Area: 576.3 km^{2} (222.5 sq mi)
- Council seat: Broadford
- Region: Hume
- County: Anglesey, Dalhousie
LGAs around Shire of Broadford:
Pyalong	Seymour	Yea
Kilmore	Shire of Broadford	Yea
Kilmore	Whittlesea	Eltham

The Shire of Broadford was a local government area about 70 kilometres (43 mi) north of Melbourne, the state capital of Victoria, Australia. The shire covered an area of 576.3 square kilometres (222.5 sq mi), and existed from 1869 until 1994.

== History ==
Broadford was first incorporated as a road district on 29 January 1869, and became a shire on 24 December 1874.

On 18 November 1994, the Shire of Broadford was abolished, and along with the Rural City of Seymour, the Shire of Pyalong, and parts of the Shire of McIvor, was merged into the newly created Shire of Mitchell. The King Parrot and Strath Creek districts were transferred to the newly created Shire of Murrindindi.

== Wards ==
The Shire of Broadford was divided into three ridings, each of which elected three councillors:

- East Riding
- North Riding
- South Riding

== Towns and localities ==
- Broadford*
- Clonbinane
- Petersons
- Reedy Creek
- Strath Creek
- Tyaak
- Waterford Park

* Council seat.

== Population ==
Year	Population
1954	1,939
1958	2,040*
1961	2,076
1966	1,978
1971	1,929
1976	2,045
1981	2,371
1986	3,230
1991	4,096

* Estimate in the 1958 Victorian Year Book.
