= Shire of Upper Yarra =

Coordinates: 37°47′S 145°36′E

Shire of Upper Yarra Victoria
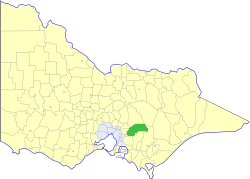
- Location in Victoria
- The Shire of Upper Yarra as at its dissolution in 1994
- Population: 15,950 (1992)
  - Density: 9.209/km^{2} (23.851/sq mi)
- Established: 1888
- Area: 1,732 km^{2} (668.7 sq mi)
- Council seat: Yarra Junction
- Region: Yarra Valley
- County: Evelyn
LGAs around Shire of Upper Yarra:
Healesville	Alexandra	Mansfield
Lillydale	Shire of Upper Yarra	Narracan
Sherbrooke	Pakenham	Buln Buln

The Shire of Upper Yarra was a local government area centred on the upper reaches of the Yarra Valley, about 60 kilometres (37 mi) east of Melbourne, the state capital of Victoria, Australia, extending eastwards into Victoria's interior. The shire covered an area of 1,732 square kilometres (668.7 sq mi), and existed from 1888 until 1994.

== History ==
Upper Yarra was incorporated as a shire on 19 October 1888. On 30 May 1919, it annexed the Lauraville Riding of the defunct Howqua Shire (the Howqua riding itself was annexed by the Shire of Mansfield), and on 4 December 1923 and 15 February 1984, it annexed parts of the Shire of Healesville.

On 15 December 1994, the Shire of Upper Yarra was abolished, and along with the Shires of Lillydale, Healesville and parts of the Shire of Sherbrooke, was merged into the newly created Shire of Yarra Ranges.

== Wards ==
The Shire of Upper Yarra was divided into three ridings on 31 March 1909, each of which elected three councillors:

- Centre Riding
- East Riding
- West Riding

== Suburbs and localities ==
The Shire of Upper Yarra included the Yarra Valley district and towns along the Warburton Highway, extending east through the Yarra Ranges National Park, to a line between the Baw Baw plateau and the town of Matlock, 110 kilometres (68 mi) from Melbourne's central business district.

- Beenak
- Big Pats Creek
- Cambarville
- Don Valley
- Gilderoy
- Gladysdale
- Hoddles Creek
- Launching Place
- McMahons Creek
- Millgrove
- Powelltown
- Reefton
- Upper Yarra Dam
- Warburton
- Warburton East
- Wesburn
- Woori Yallock
- Yarra Junction*
- Yellingbo

* Council seat.

== Population ==
Year	Population
1891	800
1911	3,644
1947	5,444
1954	6,952
1958	6,460*
1961	5,692
1966	5,458
1971	6,014
1976	7,858
1981	10,107
1986	13,637
1991	15,032

* Estimates in 1958 and 1988 Victorian Year Books.
