= List of places on the Victorian Heritage Register in the Shire of Murrindindi =

This is a list of places on the Victorian Heritage Register in the Shire of Murrindindi in Victoria, Australia. The Victorian Heritage Register is maintained by the Heritage Council of Victoria.

The Victorian Heritage Register, as of 2026, lists the following seven state-registered places within the Shire of Murrindindi:

Place name	Place #	Location	Suburb or Town	Co-ordinates	Built	State registered	Photo
Alexandra Court House and Former Shire Offices	VHR H1654	38A Downey Street	Alexandra	37.191444°S 145.711611°E	1877	20 August 1982	
Former Yea Railway Station	VHR H0771	14 Station Street	Yea	37.213889°S 145.428000°E	1889	20 August 1982	
Murrindindi Station	VHR H0371	5620 Melba Highway	Yea	37.287278°S 145.468389°E	1848	12 May 1976	
Purcell's General Store	VHR H0740	20-22 High Street	Yea	37.210902°S 145.425436°E	1887	13 December 1989	
Robbies Mill	VHR H1823	Robbie Road	Murrindindi	37.462222°S 145.646861°E	1934	17 June 1999	
Rubicon Hydro-Electric Scheme	VHR H1187	580 Rubicon Road	Rubicon	37.327124°S 145.860699°E	1928	18 April 1996	
The Hermitage	VHR H0303	161 Maroondah Highway	Narbethong	37.575972°S 145.634831°E	1894	9 October 1974	
