= Rural City of Seymour =

- Local government area
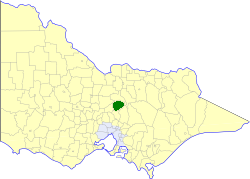
- Location in Victoria

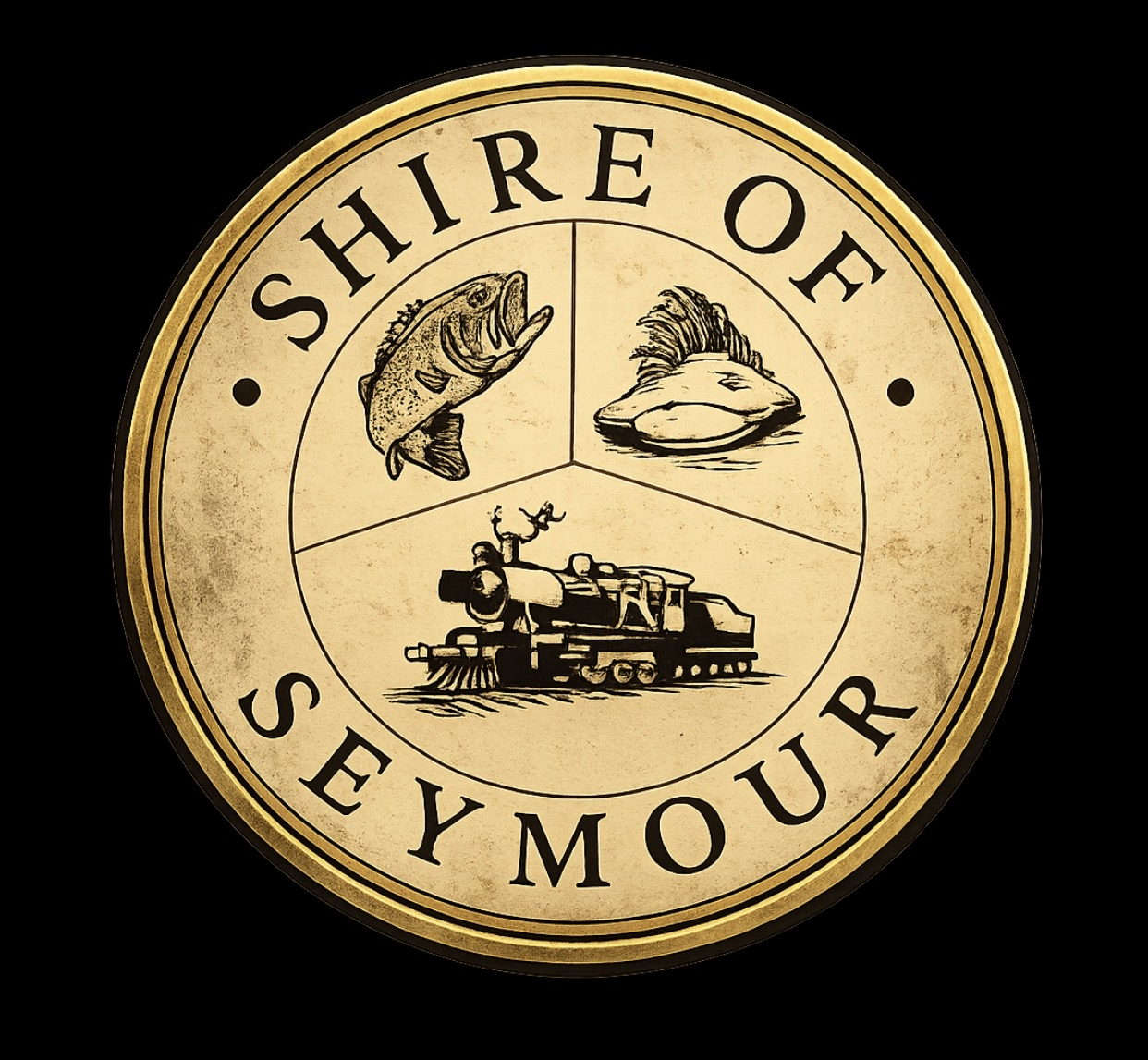
- The Rural City of Seymour as at its dissolution in 1994
- Country: Australia
- State: Victoria
- Region: Hume
- Established: 1863
- Council seat: Seymour

Area
  - Total: 945.07 km^{2} (364.89 sq mi)

Population
  - Total: 12,210 (1992)
  - Density: 12.920/km^{2} (33.462/sq mi)
- County: Anglesey, Delatite, Moira, Dalhousie
LGAs around Rural City of Seymour
McIvor	Goulburn	Goulburn
Pyalong	Rural City of Seymour	Yea
Pyalong	Broadford	Yea

The Rural City of Seymour was a local government area about 100 kilometres (62 mi) north of Melbourne, the state capital of Victoria, Australia. The rural city covered an area of 945.07 square kilometres (364.9 sq mi), and existed from 1863 until 1994.

== History ==
Seymour was incorporated as a road district on 5 May 1863, and became a shire on 24 February 1871. It lost a part of its area to the Shire of Yea on 15 May 1907. On 2 November 1993, Seymour was proclaimed a rural city.

On 18 November 1994, the Rural City of Seymour was abolished, and along with the Shires of Broadford and Pyalong, and parts of the Shire of McIvor, was merged into the newly created Shire of Mitchell. The Avenel district was transferred to the newly created Shire of Strathbogie.

== Wards ==
The Rural City of Seymour was divided into four ridings, each of which elected three councillors:

- Avenel Riding
- Seymour North Riding
- Seymour South Riding
- Tallarook Riding

== Towns and localities ==
- Avenel
- Mangalore
- Northwood
- Seymour*
- Tallarook
- Whiteheads Creek

* Council seat.

== Population ==
Year	Population
1954	11,596
1958	12,340*
1961	9,254
1966	11,248
1971	11,103
1976	10,632
1981	11,218
1986	11,412
1991	11,690

* Estimate in the 1958 Victorian Year Book.
