= Shire of Healesville =

Coordinates: 37°39′S 145°31′E

Shire of Healesville Victoria
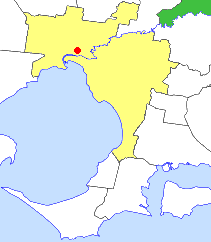
- Location in outer Melbourne
- The Shire of Healesville as at its dissolution in 1994
- Population: 12,300 (1992)
  - Density: 26.38/km^{2} (68.33/sq mi)
- Established: 1887
- Area: 466.20 km^{2} (180.0 sq mi)
- Council seat: Healesville
- Region: Yarra Valley
- County: Evelyn, Anglesey
LGAs around Shire of Healesville:
Eltham	Yea	Alexandra
Eltham	Shire of Healesville	Upper Yarra
Eltham; Lillydale	Lillydale	Upper Yarra

The Shire of Healesville was a local government area about 60 kilometres (37 mi) northeast of Melbourne, the state capital of Victoria, Australia. The shire covered an area of 466.20 square kilometres (180.0 sq mi), and existed from 1887 until 1994.

== History ==
Healesville was first incorporated as a shire on 30 September 1887. It annexed parts of the Shire of Yea on 21 April 1925, and the Christmas Hills area of the Shire of Eltham on 18 June 1958, while losing land to the Shire of Alexandra on two occasions, 1 October 1963 and 1 October 1984.

Originally the Shire of Healesville included considerable territory over the Great Dividing Range from Healesville itself. Buxton, Taggerty and Thornton were ceded to the Shire of Alexandra in 1963, while Marysville and Narbethong were not transferred until 1984.

On 15 December 1994, the Shire of Healesville was abolished, and along with the Shires of Lillydale and Upper Yarra, and parts of the Shire of Sherbrooke, was merged into the newly created Shire of Yarra Ranges.

== Wards ==
From 1967, the Shire of Healesville was divided into four ridings:

- West Riding
- Town Riding
- North Riding
- East Riding (ceded to the Shire of Alexandra and Shire of Upper Yarra in 1984)

At the time of its dissolution, it was divided into three ridings, each of which elected three councillors:

- Badger Riding
- Sugarloaf Riding
- Watts Riding

== Suburbs and localities ==
- Badger Creek
- Bend of Islands
- Castella
- Christmas Hills (shared with the Shire of Eltham)
- Chum Creek
- Dixons Creek
- Healesville*
- Narbethong
- Steels Creek
- Tarrawarra
- Toolangi
- Yarra Glen
- Yering

* Council seat.

== Population ==
Year	Population
1954	5,168
1958	5,510*
1961	5,941
1966	6,433
1971	6,410
1976	7,747
1981	9,418
1986	10,708
1991	11,755

* Estimate in the 1958 Victorian Year Book.
