= Anglesey County =

Anglesey County may refer to:

- Anglesey County, Victoria, Australia
- Anglesey County, Wales, UK
