= Shire of Lillydale =

Shire of Lillydale Victoria
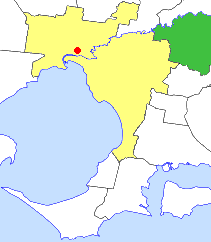
- Location in Victoria
- The Shire of Lillydale as at its dissolution in 1994
- Population: 83,400 (1992)
  - Density: 209.82/km^{2} (543.4/sq mi)
- Established: 1856
- Area: 397.49 km^{2} (153.5 sq mi)
- Council seat: Lilydale
- Region: Northeastern Melbourne
- County: Evelyn, Mornington
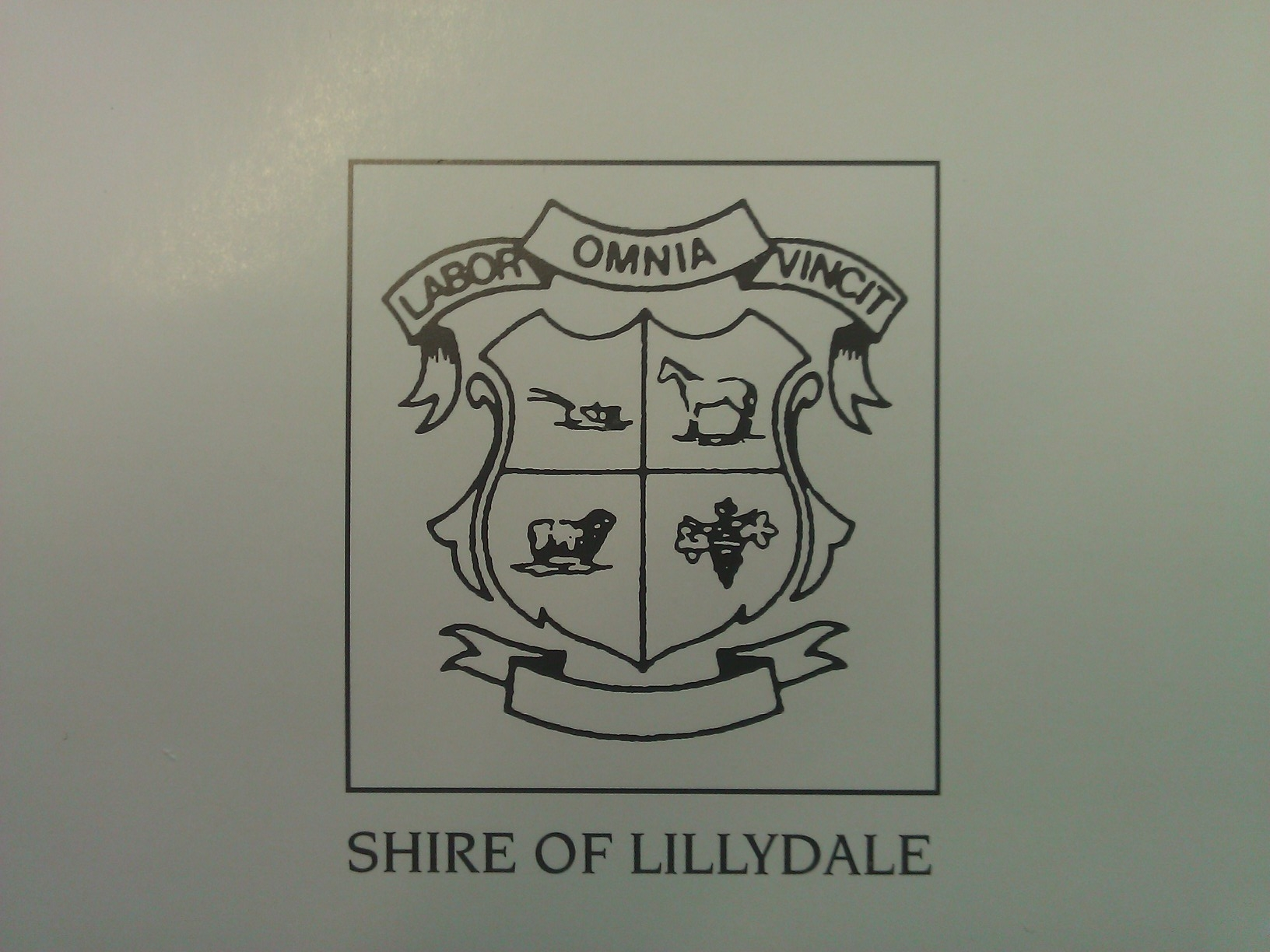
LGAs around Shire of Lillydale:
Eltham	Healesville	Upper Yarra
Doncaster & Templestowe	Shire of Lillydale	Upper Yarra
Croydon	Sherbrooke	Upper Yarra

The Shire of Lillydale (note spelling difference from the suburb of Lilydale) was a local government area about 40 kilometres (25 mi) northeast of Melbourne, the state capital of Victoria, Australia. The shire covered an area of 397.49 square kilometres (153.5 sq mi), and existed from 1856 until 1994.

== History ==
The Lillydale Road District was first created on 19 September 1856, and became a shire on 16 February 1872. It was named after Lilly de Castella, the daughter of an Australian military officer. It lost its southwestern sections when the Borough of Ringwood (22 October 1924) and the Shire of Croydon (24 May 1961) severed from the shire and incorporated separately.

On 15 December 1994, the Shire of Lillydale was abolished, and along with the Shires of Healesville and Upper Yarra, and parts of the Shire of Sherbrooke, was merged into the newly created Shire of Yarra Ranges.

Council formerly met at the Shire Offices in Lilydale.

The term "Labor Omnia Vincit", on the former Shire of Lillydale logo, is Latin for "Work conquers all".

== Wards ==
The Shire of Lillydale was divided into four ridings on 31 May 1988, each of which elected three councillors:

- North Riding
- East Riding
- South Riding
- West Riding

== Suburbs and localities ==
- Chirnside Park
- Coldstream
- Gruyere
- Kalorama
- Kilsyth (shared with the City of Croydon)
- Kilsyth South
- Lilydale*
- Monbulk (shared with the Shire of Sherbrooke)
- Montrose
- Mooroolbark
- Mount Dandenong
- Mount Evelyn
- Olinda (shared with the Shire of Sherbrooke)
- Seville
- Silvan
- Wandin East
- Wandin North
- Warrandyte South (shared with the City of Doncaster & Templestowe)
- Wonga Park
- Yering

* Council seat.

== Population ==
Year	Population
1911	6,329
1947	13,809
1954	21,107
1958	26,990*
1961	18,284+
1966	24,467
1971	36,162
1976	50,858
1981	62,077
1986	71,564
1991	78,475

* Estimate in the 1958 Victorian Year Book.
+ Croydon severed in 1961 - combined population for 1961 is 33,978.
