= Evelyn County =

Evelyn County may refer to:

- Evelyn County, New South Wales, Australia
- Evelyn County, Victoria, Australia
