= Shire of Murrindindi =

Coordinates: 37°20′00″S 145°30′00″E

- Local government area
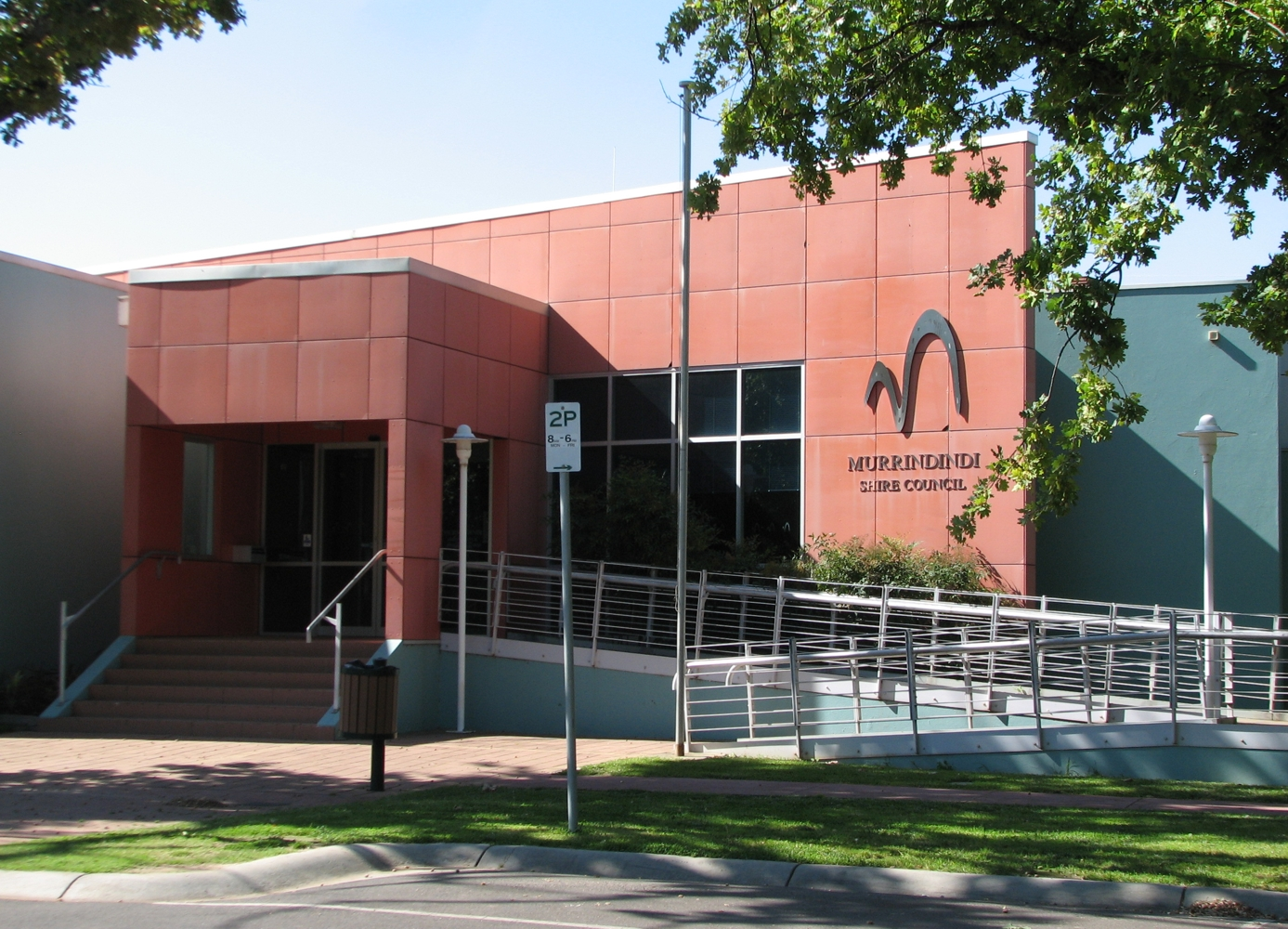
- Location in Victoria Council Offices in Alexandra

- Interactive map of Shire of Murrindindi
- Country: Australia
- State: Victoria
- Region: Hume
- Established: 1994
- Council seat: Alexandra

Government
  - Mayor: Damien Gallagher
  - State electorate: Eildon
  - Federal division: Indi

Area
  - Total: 3,880 km^{2} (1,500 sq mi)

Population
  - Total: 15,197 (2021 census)
  - Density: 3.917/km^{2} (10.144/sq mi)
- Gazetted: 18 November 1994
- Website: Shire of Murrindindi
LGAs around Shire of Murrindindi
Mitchell	Strathbogie	Mansfield
Mitchell	Shire of Murrindindi	Mansfield
Nillumbik	Yarra Ranges	Yarra Ranges

The Shire of Murrindindi is a local government area in the Hume region of Victoria, Australia, located in the north-east part of the state. It covers an area of 3,880 square kilometres (1,500 mi^{2}) and, in August 2021, had a population of 15,197. It includes the towns of Alexandra, Buxton, Eildon, Flowerdale, Kinglake, Marysville, Molesworth, Strath Creek, Taggerty, Yarck and Yea.

The Shire is governed by the Murrindindi Shire Council; its seat of local government and administrative centre is located at the council headquarters in Alexandra, it also has service centres located in Kinglake and Yea. The Shire is named after the locality of Murrindindi, which is located near the geographical centre of the LGA.

The Lake Mountain ski resort is an unincorporated area near the southern border of the shire, which creates a small exclave.

== History ==
The Shire of Murrindindi was formed in 1994 from the amalgamation of the Shire of Alexandra, Shire of Yea, and parts of the Shire of Broadford, Shire of Eltham, Shire of Euroa, Shire of Healesville and City of Whittlesea.

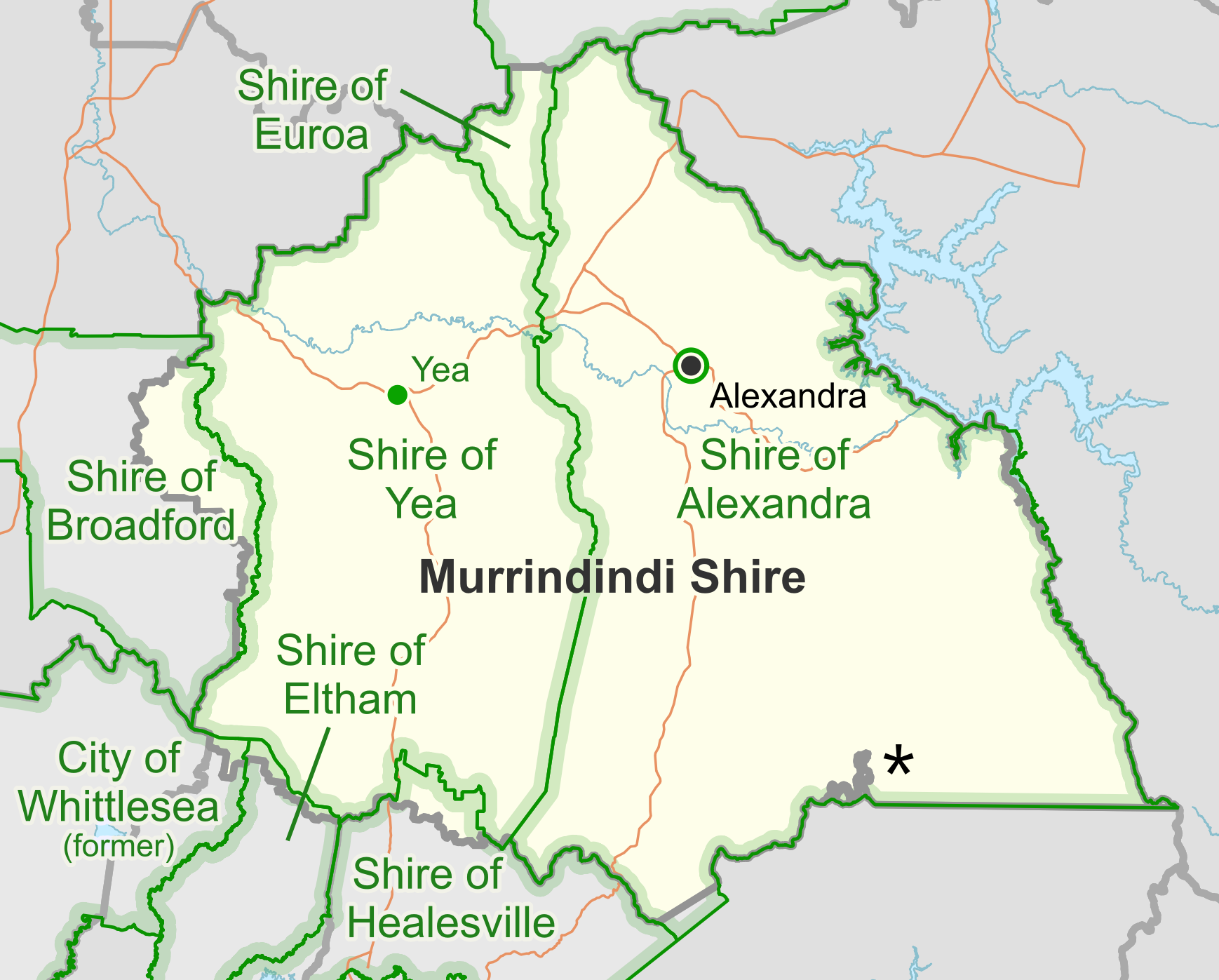
Murrindindi Shire's predecessor LGAs (green) as they were in 1994. The administrative centres of the former LGAs are marked by green dots. 🞲 The Lake Mountain Alpine Resort was excised in 1997

=== Black Saturday ===
Parts of Murrindindi were badly affected by the 2009 Victorian bushfires, notably the towns of Marysville and Kinglake. In total, 106 people died across the Shire including 38 in Kinglake and 34 in Marysville.

== Council ==
=== Current composition ===
2024 ward boundaries. Expand the map and click on a ward to see the ward name.

The council is composed of seven wards and seven councillors, with one councillor elected to represent each ward.

Ward	Councillor
Cathedral	Sandice McAulay
Cheviot	Sue Carpenter
Eildon	Karine Haslem
King Parrot	Eric Lording
Kinglake	Ilona Gerencser
Koriella	John Walsh
Red Gate	Damien Gallagher

=== Administration and governance ===
The Council meets on a monthly basis for Scheduled Meetings and from time to time for Unscheduled Meetings. The meetings are streamed live on Council's Facebook page. Council provides customer services from its Library and Customer Service Centres in Alexandra, Kinglake and Yea and also from its Mobile Library and Customer Service.

=== Media ===
Murrindindi Shire activities are covered weekly in local print publications and also on local radio UGFM. The latest information is also made available on Council's website and Facebook pages.

== Townships and localities ==
The 2021 census recorded the shire population at 15,197, compared to 13,732 in the 2016 census.

Population
Locality	2016	2021
Acheron	171	146
Alexandra	2,695	2,801
Buxton	492	591
Castella	268	257
Cathkin	25	27
Caveat	41	59
Devils River	14	14
Dropmore	8	19
Eildon	974	944
Enochs Point^	0	3
Fawcett	60	82
Flowerdale^	689	790
Ghin Ghin	41	64
Glenburn	415	443
Gobur	85	102
Gooram^	148	141
Highlands^	122	151
Homewood	54	70
Kanumbra^	59	53
Kerrisdale	73	86
Killingworth	106	156
Kinglake^	1,536	1,662
Kinglake Central	345	413
Kinglake West^	1,166	1,305
Koriella	60	66
Limestone	82	121
Maintongoon	60	75
Marysville	394	501
Merton^	190	216
Molesworth	72	91
Murrindindi	107	114
Narbethong	205	201
Pheasant Creek	322	360
Rubicon	56	44
Ruffy^	112	164
Strath Creek	164	231
Taggerty	328	405
Taylor Bay	38	76
Terip Terip	57	72
Thornton	299	311
Toolangi^	344	366
Trawool^	108	90
Whanregarwen	100	130
Yarck	168	194
Yea	1,587	1,789

^ - Territory divided with another LGA

Cheviot was a former town in the Shire of Murrindindi.

== See also ==
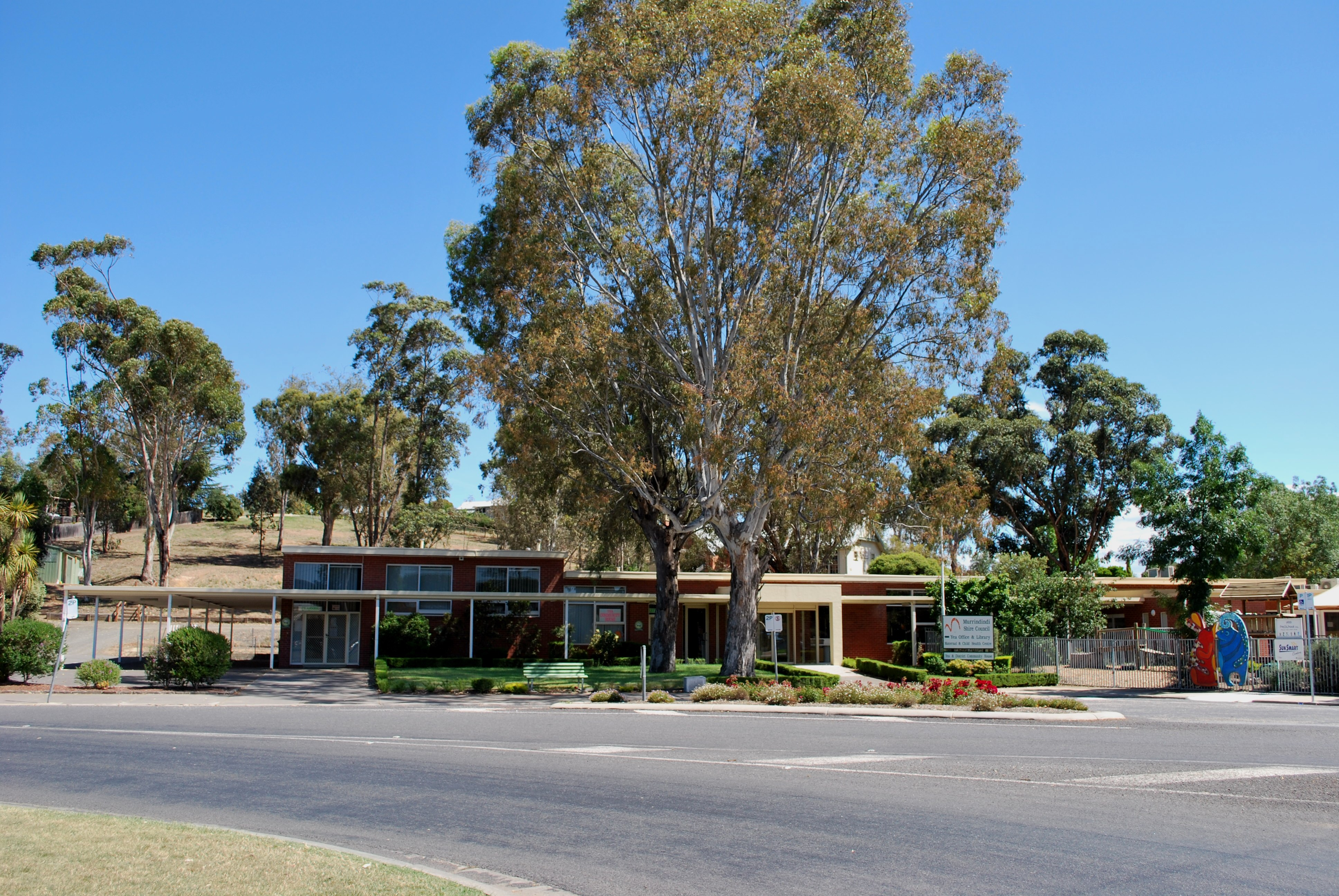
Council service centre and library in Yea

- List of localities (Victoria)
- List of places on the Victorian Heritage Register in the Shire of Murrindindi
