= Shire of Pyalong =

Coordinates: 37°07′S 144°51′E

Shire of Pyalong Victoria
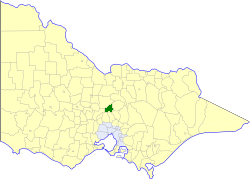
- Location in Victoria
- The Shire of Pyalong as at its dissolution in 1994
- Population: 810 (1992)
  - Density: 1.402/km^{2} (3.632/sq mi)
- Established: 1863
- Area: 577.57 km^{2} (223.0 sq mi)
- Council seat: Pyalong
- Region: Hume
- County: Dalhousie
LGAs around Shire of Pyalong:
McIvor	McIvor	Seymour
Kyneton	Shire of Pyalong	Seymour
Romsey	Kilmore	Broadford

The Shire of Pyalong was a local government area about 85 kilometres (53 mi) north of Melbourne, the state capital of Victoria, Australia. The shire covered an area of 577.57 square kilometres (223.0 sq mi), and existed from 1863 until 1994.

== History ==
Pyalong was incorporated as a road district on 2 September 1863, and became a shire on 5 May 1871.

At the time of its dissolution, the Shire of Pyalong was easily the least populous municipality in Victoria. State Government data for 1992 gives a population figure of 760 residents; the next smallest LGA, the Shire of Birchip, had 1,300 residents. In that year, the Shire of Pyalong employed 10 full-time equivalent staff, the fewest of any Victorian municipality.

On 18 November 1994, the Shire of Pyalong was abolished, and along with the Rural City of Seymour, the Shire of Broadford and parts of the Shire of McIvor, was merged into the newly created Shire of Mitchell.

== Wards ==
The Shire of Pyalong was divided into three ridings, each of which elected three councillors:

- East Riding
- South Riding
- West Riding

== Towns and localities ==
- Glenaroua
- Moranding
- Puckapunyal
- Pyalong*
- Sugarloaf Creek

* Council seat.

== Population ==
Year	Population
1954	483
1958	500*
1961	456
1966	456
1971	439
1976	472
1981	495
1986	602
1991	744

* Estimate in the 1958 Victorian Year Book.
