= Five Ways, Mooroolbark =

Road intersection in Melbourne, Australia

Five Ways is a major road junction in the Melbourne suburb of Mooroolbark, Australia, at which four roads converge from five different angles. It is notable for its unusual arrangement of three connecting roundabouts to manage traffic flow.

== Description ==
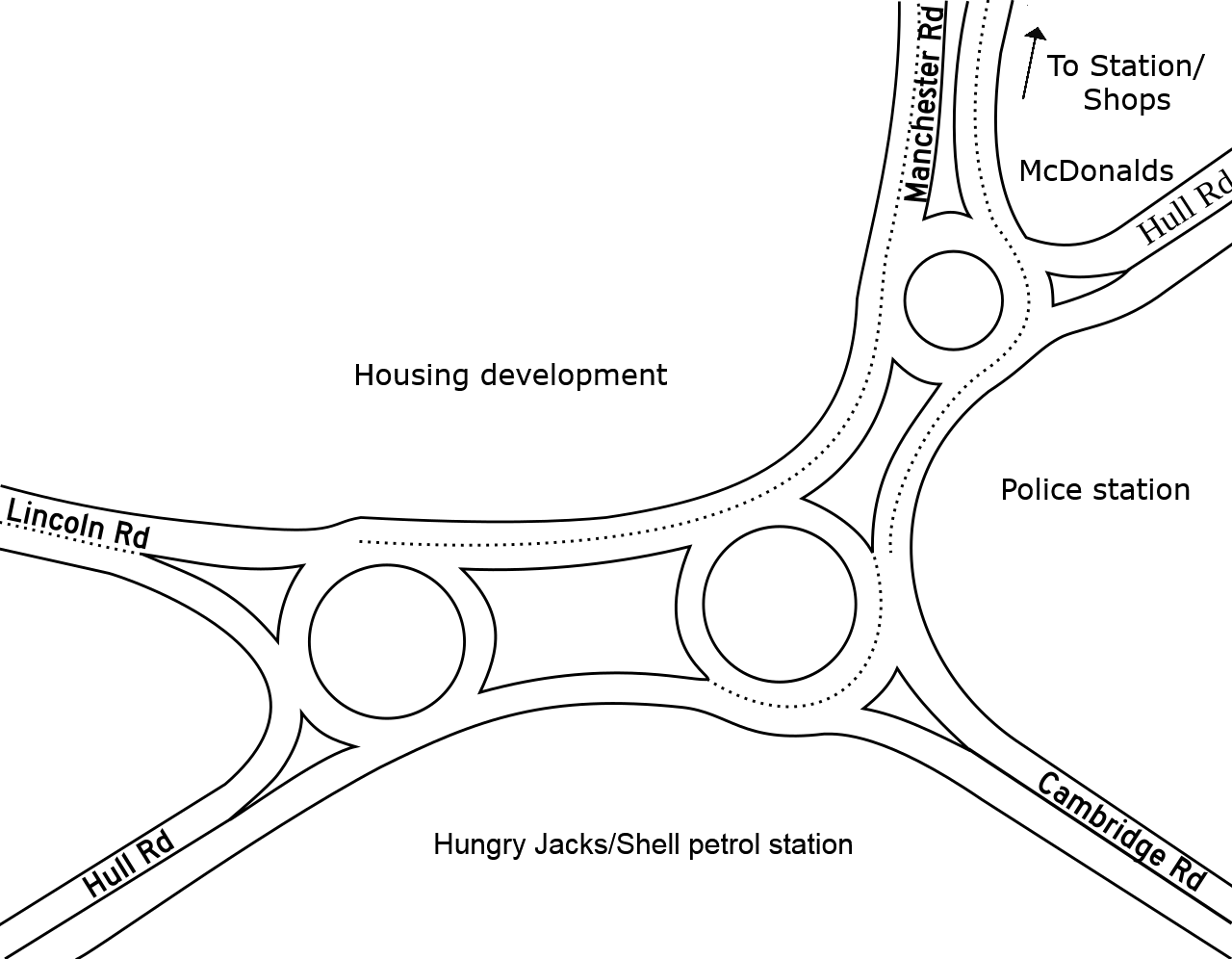
Layout of Five Ways (as of January 2026).

The four roads at this junction are:

- Lincoln Road
- Manchester Road
- Hull Road
- Cambridge Road

The three roundabouts are uncontrolled by traffic lights. Several driveways and access roads lead directly into the junction.

A single signalised pedestrian crossing is located east of the intersection on Hull Road.

== History ==
Hull Road was one of the earliest roads laid out through Mooroolbark after the area was surveyed in 1855. It formed one of two routes between the towns of Ringwood and Lilydale. Like many other roads in the area it follows the ridge of nearby hills to minimise steep gradients for animals, carts and pedestrians.

The three other roads were initially laid out to meet Hull Road at individual intersections. As the number of people and goods travelling through the area increased significantly as Melbourne's suburbs rapidly expanded after the Second World War, crashes at these intersections also increased. Mooroolbark Primary School moved to premises on the north-west corner of Hull Road and Manchester Road in 1935.

In 1948 the Shire of Lillydale constructed minor upgrades to the intersection. This involved widening the roadway and increasing space for turning vehicles on Lincoln Road at its intersection with Hull Road.

The population of Mooroolbark and nearby suburbs continued to rapidly expand as houses and commercial tenancies were built through the 1960s, 1970s and 1980s. This current and predicted growth in traffic caused a reconstruction of the three intersections into a single junction in 1969. By 1970, the current layout with three roundabouts was completed and has remained mostly unchanged.

A new development directly on the roundabout proposed to add an extra traffic lane in 2017 but this did not occur.
