= Limestone, Victoria =

Limestone
- Town
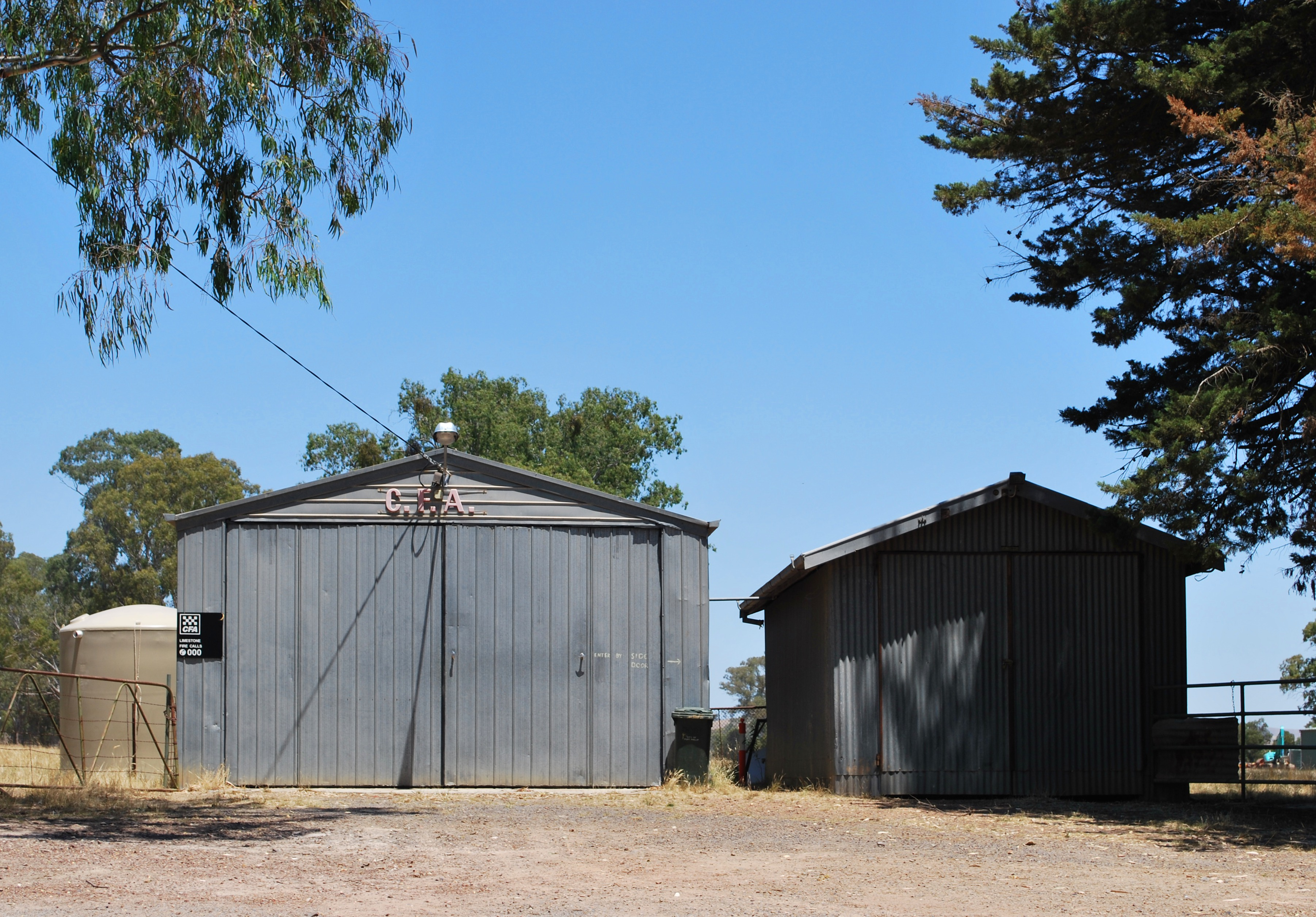
- Country Fire Authority shed at Limestone

- Interactive map of Limestone
- Coordinates: 37°15′S 145°30′E
- Country: Australia
- State: Victoria
- Region: Hume
- LGA: Shire of Murrindindi
- Location: 123 km (76 mi) NE of Melbourne; 41 km (25 mi) SE of Seymour; 8 km (5.0 mi) SE of Yea

Government
  - State electorate: Eildon
  - Federal division: Indi

Population
  - Total: 121 (2021 census)
- Postcode: 3717

Limestone is a locality in the Shire of Murrindindi, north eastern Victoria, in eastern Australia.
