= Yarra Valley =

River valley in Victoria, Australia

- Region
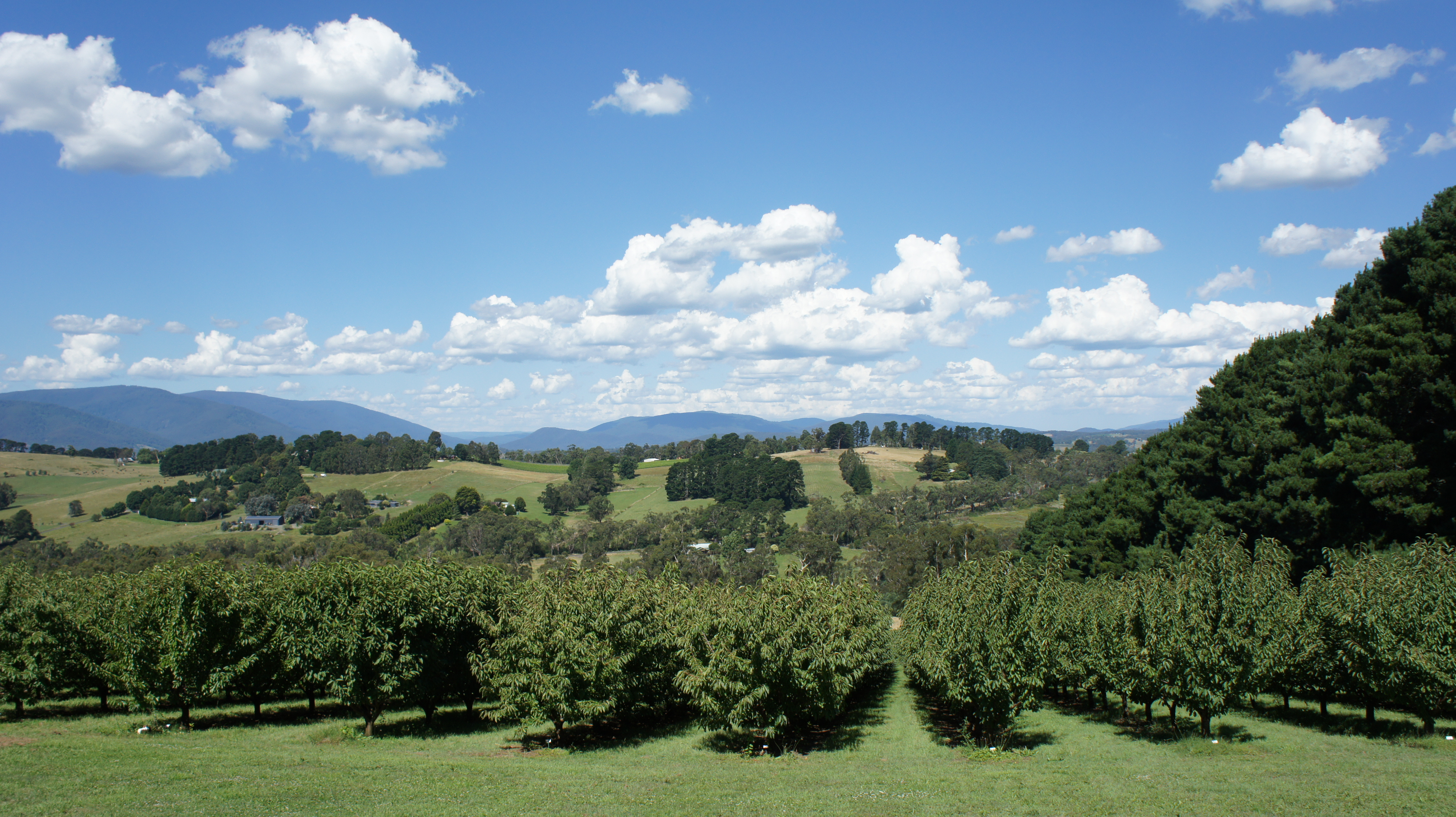

- Coordinates: 37°45′17″S 145°31′22″E
- Country: Australia
- State: Victoria

Population
  - Total: 16,161 (SA2 2021)

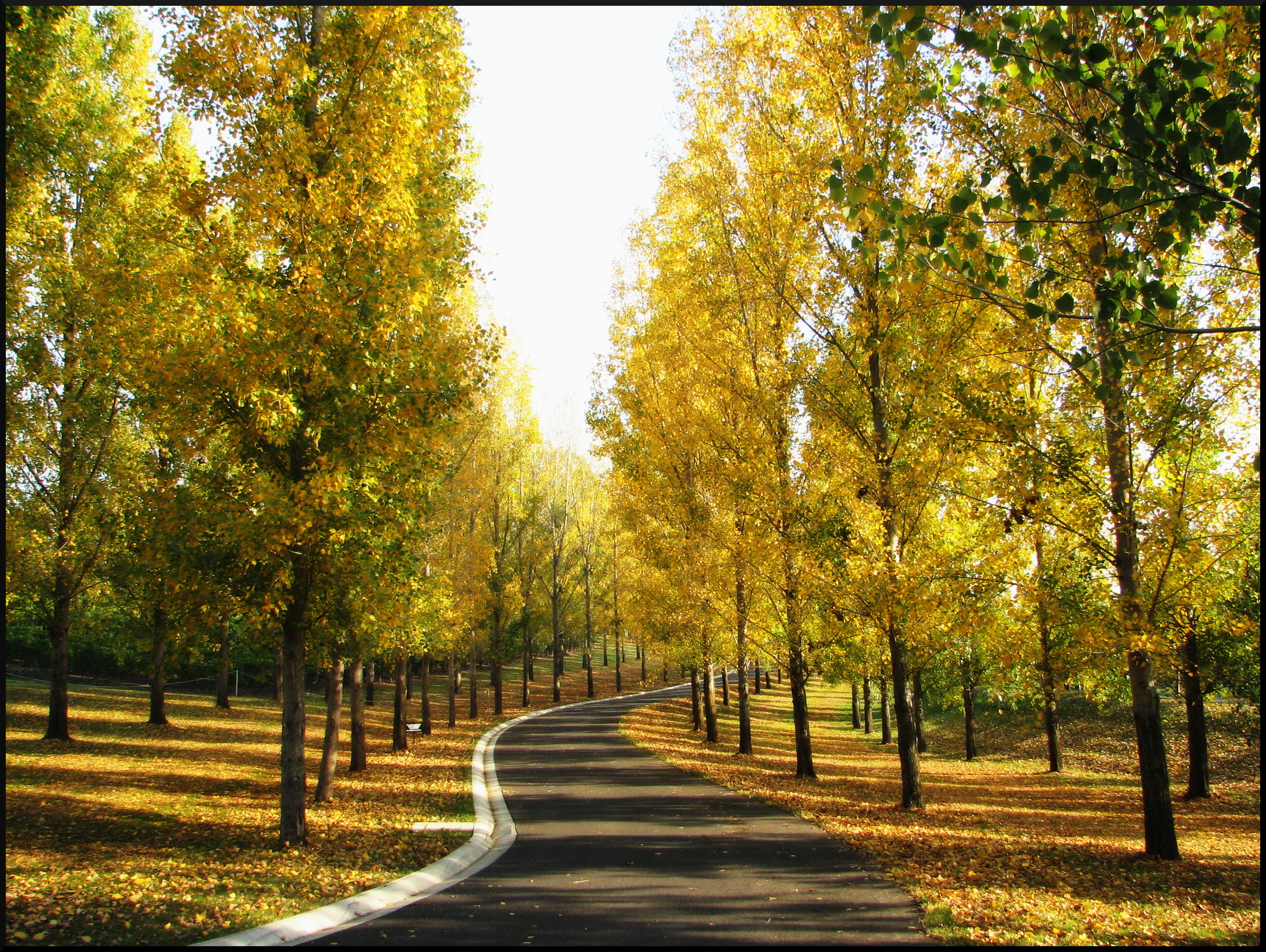
Autumn in Tarra Warra Estate.

The Yarra Valley is a region in Victoria, Australia, centred around the Yarra River. Known for its natural beauty, agricultural significance, and as one of Australia's prominent wine-producing areas, the valley stretches from the upper reaches of the river near its source in the Yarra Ranges National Park down to the flatter lands as it approaches Melbourne.

== Geography and environment ==
The Yarra River begins in the rugged, forested area of the Yarra Ranges, approximately 240 kilometres (150 mi) east of Melbourne's central business district. The valley runs along the river as it flows westward, descending through a series of environmental zones from mountain ranges and dense bushland to gentler, fertile plains that support vineyards and farmland. The term "Yarra Valley" commonly refers to the upper and middle regions surrounding the river, where the landscape is defined by rolling hills and agricultural lands.

== Upper Yarra Valley ==
The Upper Yarra Valley refers to the Yarra River catchment upstream of Woori Yallock and includes towns like Warburton, Yarra Junction, and Launching Place. Historically part of the former Shire of Upper Yarra, this sub-region is known for its forested mountains and national parks, as well as its cooler climate, which impacts local agriculture and viticulture. This part of the valley is popular for outdoor recreation, including bushwalking, cycling, and wildlife observation.

== Economy and agriculture ==
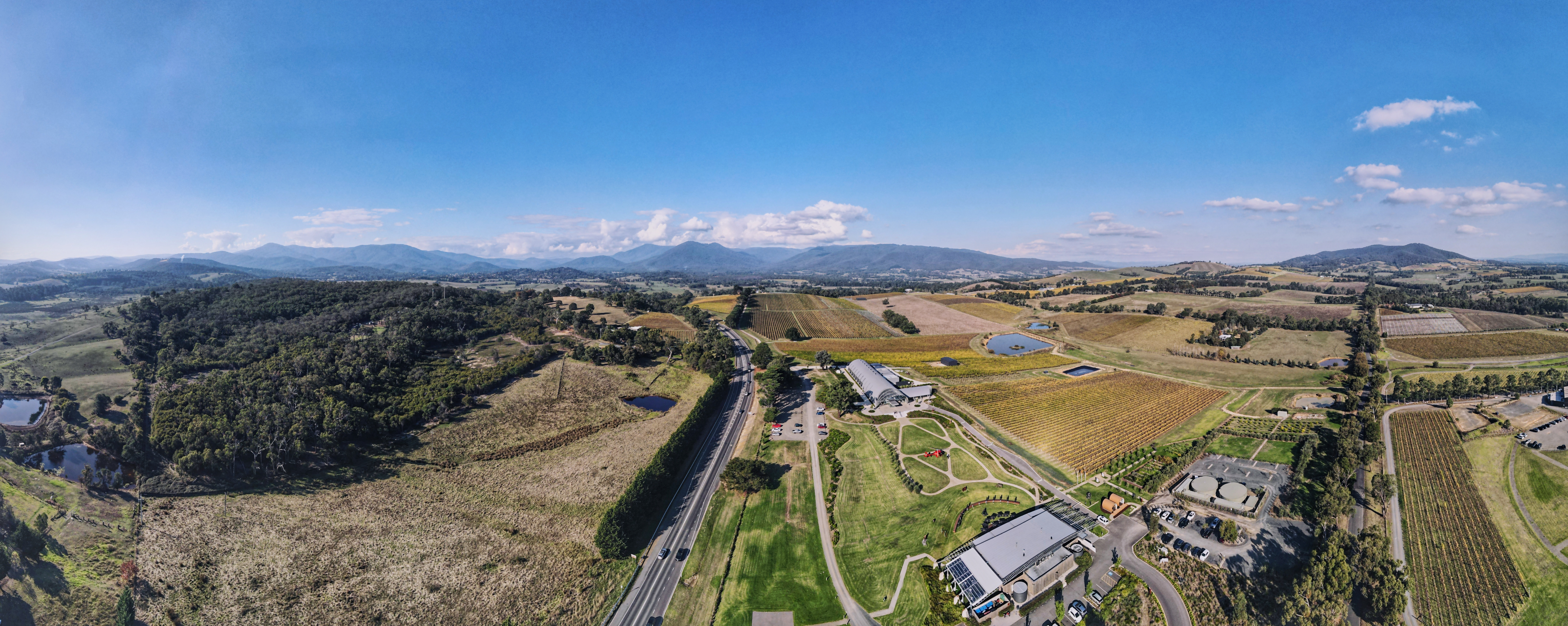
Yarra Valley wine region panorama. Facing East. Shot on 230422

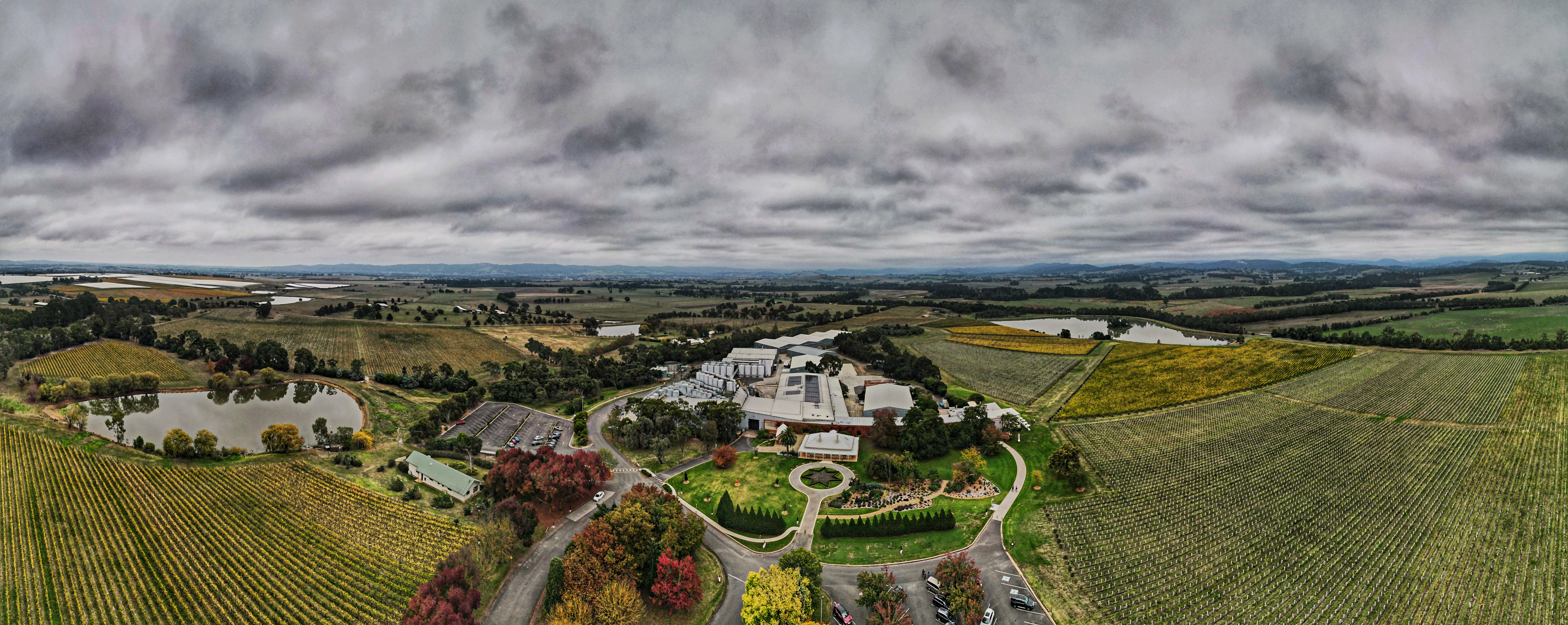
Domain Chandon Yarra Valley aerial panorama. Shot on 240422.

The Yarra Valley has a diverse economy with agriculture playing a vital role. The valley's mild climate and fertile soils make it ideal for producing a variety of crops, including grapes, fruits, and vegetables. The region is renowned for its cool-climate wine production, particularly chardonnay, pinot noir, and sparkling wine. The wine industry in the Yarra Valley is one of Australia's oldest, with the first vineyards planted in the 1830s, and has since grown to encompass over 80 wineries.

Local farms also produce honey, dairy, and artisanal products, contributing to a robust food industry. The agricultural output supports a growing culinary scene, with regional restaurants and markets offering farm-to-table produce and gourmet foods that are increasingly popular with both locals and visitors.

== Tourism ==
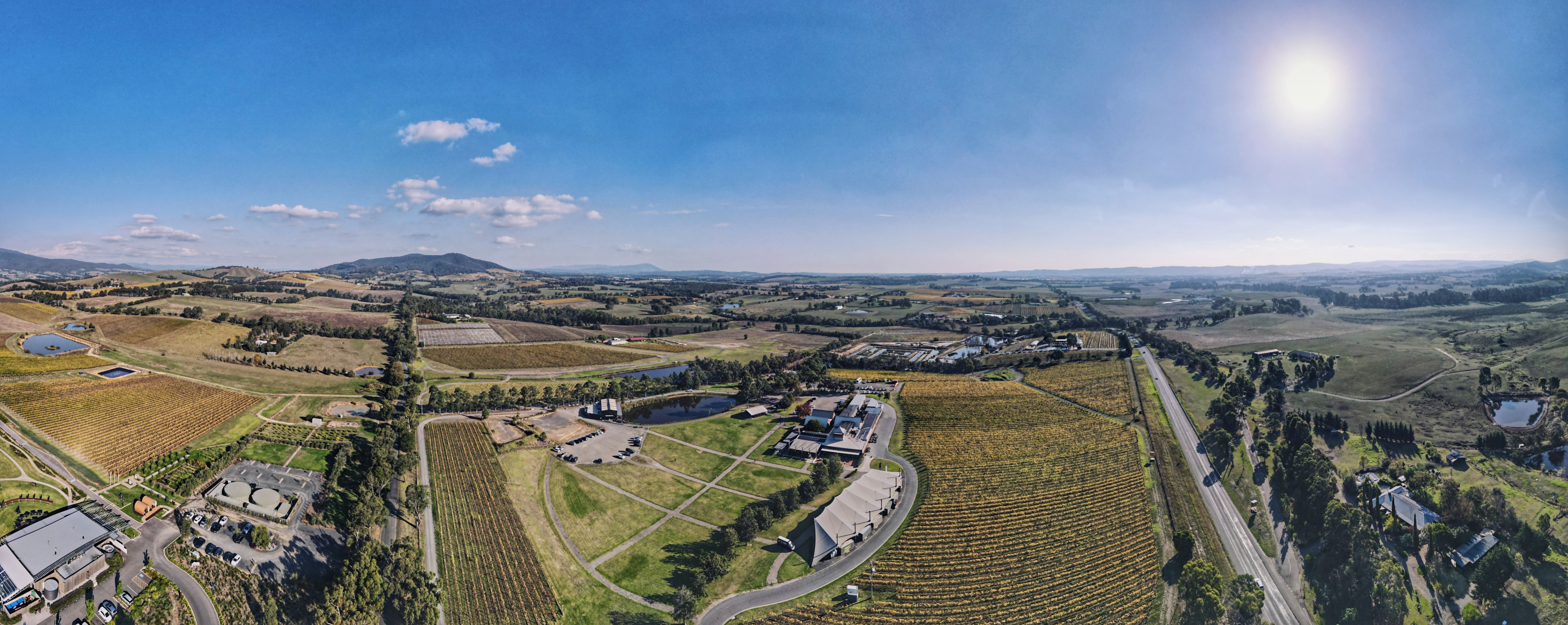
Yarra Valley wine region panorama. Facing West. Shot on 230422

The Yarra Valley is one of Victoria's primary tourism regions, attracting visitors with its natural landscapes, wineries, and outdoor activities. The Lilydale to Warburton Rail Trail is a popular 40-kilometre track that follows an old railway line, frequented by cyclists, walkers, and equestrians. Other natural attractions include the Healesville Sanctuary, a conservation-focused wildlife park that showcases native Australian animals, and several parks and reserves in the Yarra Ranges, which offer hiking trails and scenic views.

Winery tours are a major attraction, drawing tourists from across Australia and internationally. Many wineries offer cellar door tastings and restaurants with views over the vineyards, making the Yarra Valley a destination for food and wine tourism.

== Towns and local governance ==
Towns within the Yarra Valley are governed by the Shire of Yarra Ranges and the Shire of Nillumbik.

Notable towns include:

- Healesville: Known for its vibrant arts community, Healesville Sanctuary, and a variety of food and beverage venues, including breweries and cafes.
- Yarra Glen: A heritage town with antique shops, galleries, and a monthly farmer's market.
- Warburton: Surrounded by forested mountains, it is a gateway to the Yarra Ranges National Park and known for its natural beauty and scenic walking trails.
- Coldstream: Often the first stop for visitors exploring the wine region, Coldstream is home to several prominent wineries and agricultural estates.

These towns contribute to the Yarra Valley's culture, each with unique attractions and amenities that make them popular hubs for tourists exploring the area.

== Cultural significance and media ==
The Yarra Valley has served as a filming location for various television and film productions, including the Australian series The Saddle Club, which used the valley's landscapes to depict rural Australia. Additionally, the region has a vibrant art scene, with local galleries and workshops showcasing works inspired by the valley's natural beauty.

== See also ==
- Yarra Valley (wine)
- Australian wine
- Shire of Upper Yarra
- Shire of Healesville

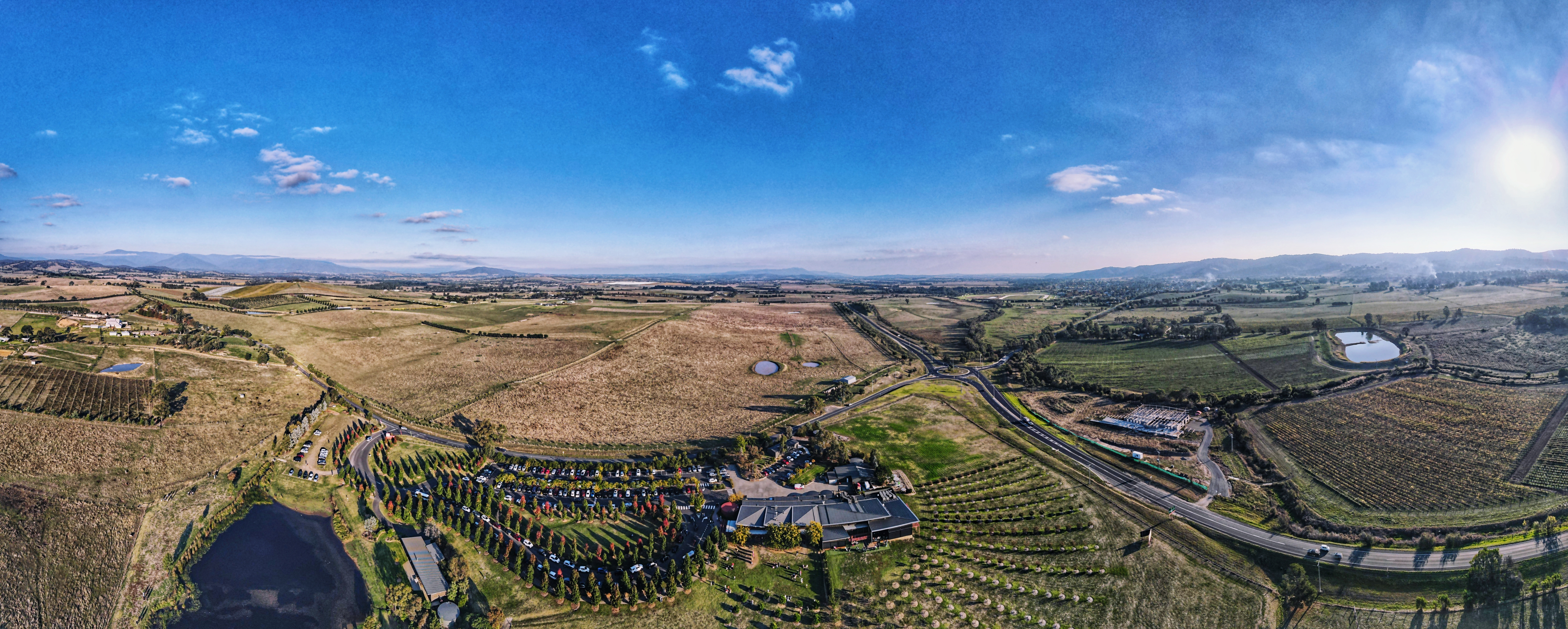
Yarra Valley Chocolatarie Panorama. Shot on 240422.

== Literature ==
- Brian Finlayson: The Physical Geography of the Yarra Valleymore, in: Yarra River Conference, 13–16 April 1991, pp. 1–10 (Online)
