= Shire of Eltham =

Coordinates: 37°43′S 145°09′E

Shire of Eltham Victoria
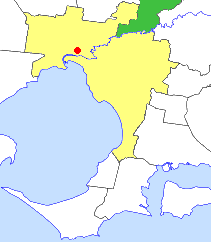
- Location in outer Melbourne
- The extent of the Shire of Eltham at its dissolution in 1994
- Population: 44,800 (1992)
  - Density: 161.66/km^{2} (418.7/sq mi)
- Established: 1856
- Area: 277.13 km^{2} (107.0 sq mi)
- Council seat: Eltham
- Region: Northeast Melbourne
- County: Evelyn
LGAs around Shire of Eltham:
Whittlesea	Yea	Yea
Diamond Valley	Shire of Eltham	Healesville
Heidelberg	Doncaster & Templestowe	Lillydale

The Shire of Eltham was a local government area about 25 kilometres (16 mi) northeast of Melbourne, the state capital of Victoria, Australia. The shire covered an area of 277.13 square kilometres (107.0 sq mi), and existed from 1856 until 1994.

== History ==
Eltham was first incorporated as a road district on 26 September 1856, and became a shire on 6 April 1871. In 1878, it was altered and re-defined. In 1912, it lost some of its area to the Shire of Healesville.

In August 1918, Eltham Shire Council discussed and "generally expressed themselves as favourable to the proposal" to obtain a "piece of land on the summit of Garden Hill, Kangaroo Ground, and the formation of a memorial park in which a monument could be erected to represent the whole of the Shire." It was opened on Armistice Day, 11 November 1926, by the governor-general, Lord John Baird Stonehaven. The site became known as the Kangaroo Ground War Memorial Park.

On 18 June 1958, it lost its 218 km^{2} (84.2 sq mi) East Riding to the Shire of Healesville. This area comprised Yarra Glen, Dixons Creek and parts of Christmas Hills. It also lost part of its North Riding, near Kinglake, to the Shire of Yea, on 1 October 1972.

On 15 December 1994, the Shire of Eltham was abolished, and along with parts of the City of Whittlesea and the Shire of Diamond Valley, was merged into the newly created Shire of Nillumbik. The Kinglake district was transferred to the Shire of Murrindindi, while Montmorency and Lower Plenty, in the shire's far southwest, were transferred to the newly created City of Banyule.

== Wards ==
The Shire of Eltham was divided into three ridings on 16 March 1955, each of which elected three councillors:

- Central Riding
- North Riding
- West Riding

== Suburbs and localities ==
- Briar Hill (shared with the Shire of Diamond Valley)
- Christmas Hills (shared with the Shire of Healesville)
- Cottles Bridge
- Eltham*
- Greensborough (shared with the Shire of Diamond Valley)
- Hurstbridge (shared with the City of Whittlesea and the Shire of Diamond Valley)
- Kangaroo Ground
- Kinglake (shared with the Shire of Yea)
- Lower Plenty
- Montmorency
- Panton Hill
- Research
- Smiths Gully
- St Andrews
- Strathewen
- Warrandyte North
- Watsons Creek
- Wattle Glen (shared with the Shire of Diamond Valley)

* Council seat.

== Population ==
Year	Population
1911	3,423
1947	7,028
1954	11,441
1958	14,660*
1961	16,575
1966	20,213
1971	23,712
1976	28,631
1981	34,648
1986	39,784
1991	42,670

* Estimate in 1958 Victorian Year Book.

== Books on the Shire of Eltham ==
- Marshall, Alan, Pioneers and Painters: One Hundred years of Eltham and its Shire Melbourne, Thomas Nelson, 1971 ISBN 0-17-001948-9
- Marshall, Marguerite, Nillumbik Now and Then Research, Vic. MPrint Publications, 2008 ISBN 978-0-646-49122-6
