= Glenburn, Victoria =

Glenburn
- Town
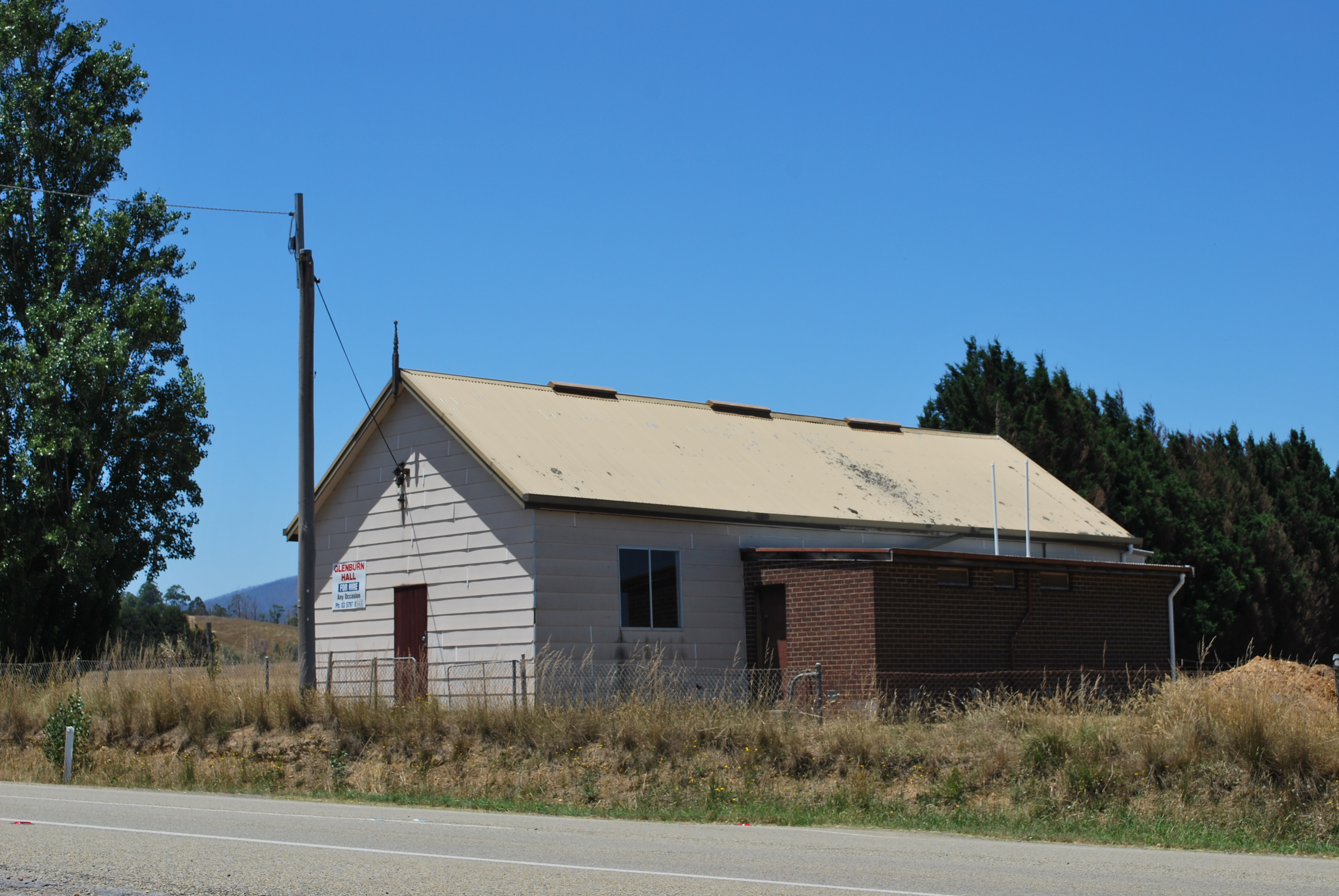
- Glenburn Hall

- Coordinates: 37°25′S 145°25′E
- Country: Australia
- State: Victoria
- Region: Hume
- LGA: Shire of Murrindindi
- Location: 85 km (53 mi) from Melbourne; 32 km (20 mi) from Yea

Government
  - State electorate: Eildon
  - Federal division: Indi
- Elevation: 299 m (981 ft)

Population
  - Total: 443 (2021 census)
- Postcode: 3717
Localities around Glenburn
Hazeldene	Strath Creek	Murrindindi
Flowerdale	Glenburn	Murrindindi
Flowerdale	Castella	Toolangi

Glenburn is a locality in Victoria, Australia. It is in the local government area of the Shire of Murrindindi. At the 2021 census, Glenburn had a population of 443.

The Post Office opened in 1902 and was known as Glenburn Creamery until 1907.
