= County of Bourke, Victoria =

Bourke
- Cadastral division
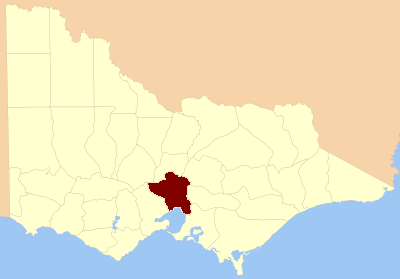
- Location in Victoria
- Country: Australia
- State: Victoria
- Established: 22 June 1853

Area
  - Total: 4,457 km^{2} (1,721 sq mi)
Lands administrative divisions around Bourke
Talbot	Dalhousie	Anglesey
Grant	Bourke	Evelyn
Grant	Port Phillip	Mornington

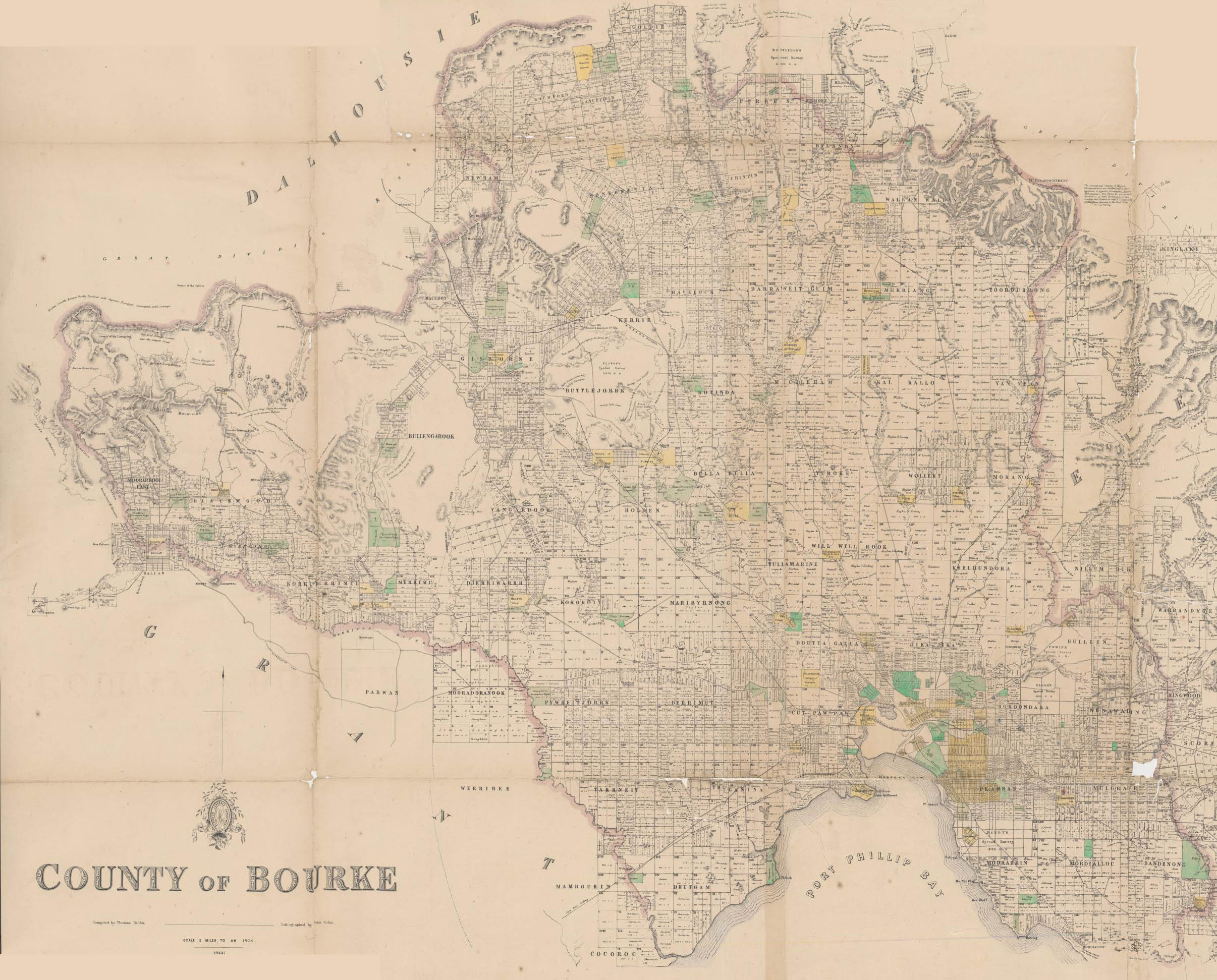
1866 map of Bourke County showing the parishes

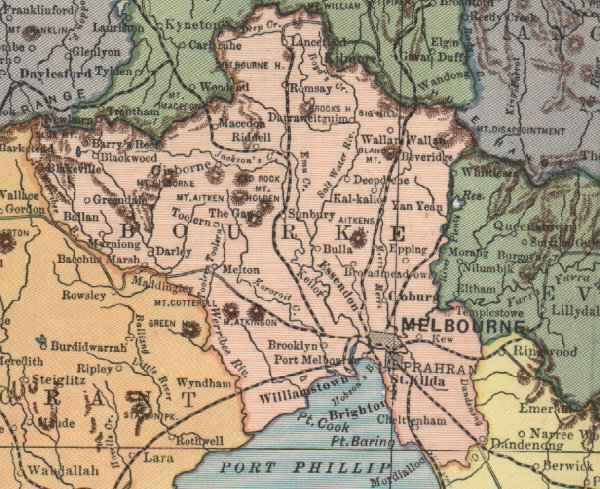
1885 map of Bourke County (pink)

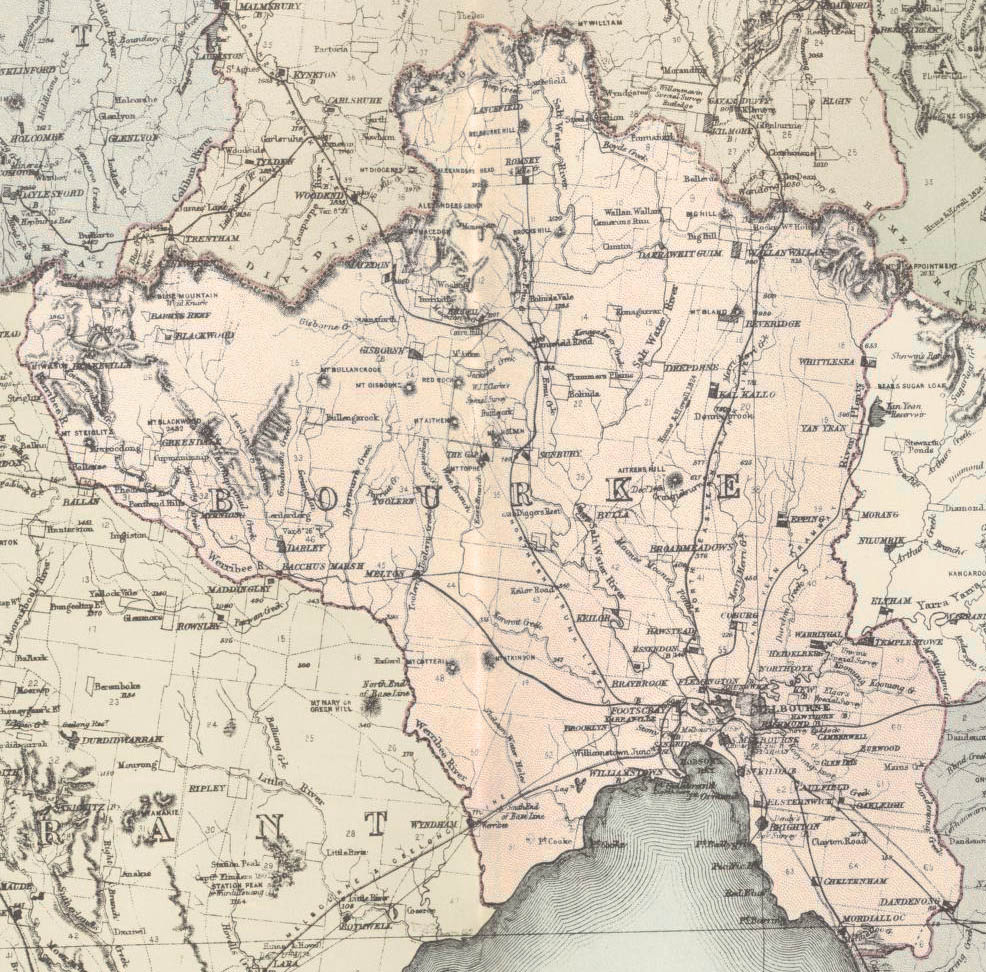
1886 map of Bourke County

The County of Bourke is one of the 37 counties of Victoria which are part of the Lands administrative divisions of Australia, (used for land titles and no longer other administrative or political function). It is the oldest and most populous county in Victoria and contains the city of Melbourne. Like other counties in Victoria, it is subdivided into parishes. The county was named after Irish born Sir Richard Bourke, the Governor of New South Wales between 1831 and 1837. It is bordered by the Werribee River in the west; the Great Dividing Range in the north; Port Phillip in the south; and by Dandenong Creek, a small part of the Yarra River, and the Plenty River in the east. The county was proclaimed in 1853.

The "Melbourne and County of Bourke Police" was the name for the police force in the area before 1853. The County of Bourke was used on the name of the electoral roll in 1845. There was also the "Bourke County Court" in the 1850s, which became the County Court of Victoria. Melbourne is also referenced as being in "Bourke county" in the Encyclopædia Britannica Eleventh Edition.

== Parishes ==
Following is a list of parishes within the County of Bourke. Many of the links below link to a modern suburb or town, which is situated within the parish. In most cases, the parish itself is much bigger than the modern suburb or town.

Several of the parishes are also part of a neighbouring county. For example, Bylands, Forbes, Goldie, Lancefield and Newham parishes are located in the County of Bourke as well as the County of Dalhousie. Morang, Toorourrong and Yan Yean parishes are in the County of Bourke as well as the County of Evelyn. Finally, Ballan parish is situated within both the County of Bourke and the County of Grant.

Parish	LGA	Coordinates	Ref	Map
Blackwood	Shire of Moorabool	37°29′57″S 144°19′25″E	Vicnames	
Bollinda	City of Hume	37°31′57″S 144°47′59″E	Vicnames	
Boroondara	City of Boroondara	37°48′47″S 145°04′04″E	Vicnames	
Bulla Bulla	City of Hume	37°36′05″S 144°48′42″E	Vicnames	
Bulleen	City of Manningham	37°45′59″S 145°09′11″E	Vicnames	
Bullengarook	Shire of Macedon Ranges	37°30′22″S 144°30′49″E	Vicnames	
Buttlejorrk	City of Hume	37°32′09″S 144°41′21″E	Vicnames	
Bylands	Shire of Mitchell	37°20′44″S 144°58′25″E	Vicnames	
Chintin	Shire of Macedon Ranges	37°22′36″S 144°51′11″E	Vicnames	
Coimadai	Shire of Moorabool	37°34′34″S 144°27′25″E	Vicnames	
Coornmill	Shire of Moorabool	37°29′20″S 144°25′33″E	Vicnames	
Cut Paw Paw	City of Maribyrnong	37°48′32″S 144°52′29″E	Vicnames	
Dandenong	City of Greater Dandenong	37°58′18″S 145°11′28″E	Vicnames	
Darraweit Guim	Shire of Macedon Ranges	37°28′00″S 144°53′41″E	Vicnames	
Derrimut	City of Melton	37°46′46″S 144°45′03″E	Vicnames	
Deutgam	City of Wyndham	37°55′17″S 144°43′42″E	Vicnames	
Djerriwarrh	City of Melton	37°40′36″S 144°33′44″E	Vicnames	
Doutta Galla	City of Moonee Valley	37°44′56″S 144°54′30″E	Vicnames	
Forbes	Shire of Mitchell	37°18′48″S 144°53′16″E	Vicnames	
Gisborne	Shire of Macedon Ranges	37°29′04″S 144°36′01″E	Vicnames	
Goldie	Shire of Macedon Ranges	37°14′31″S 144°49′32″E	Vicnames	
Jika Jika	City of Darebin	37°45′02″S 144°59′28″E	Vicnames	
Havelock	Shire of Macedon Ranges	37°27′16″S 144°48′53″E	Vicnames	
Holden	City of Melton	37°37′06″S 144°42′29″E	Vicnames	
Jika Jika	City of Whittlesea	37°45′02″S 144°59′28″E	Vicnames	
Kalkallo	City of Whittlesea	37°33′02″S 144°59′51″E	Vicnames	
Keelbundora	City of Darebin	37°42′53″S 145°03′45″E	Vicnames	
Kerrie	Shire of Macedon Ranges	37°26′00″S 144°41′44″E	Vicnames	
Korkuperrimul	Shire of Moorabool	37°39′09″S 144°24′08″E	Vicnames	
Kororoit	City of Melton	37°41′50″S 144°38′48″E	Vicnames	
Lancefield	Shire of Macedon Ranges	37°17′01″S 144°44′47″E	Vicnames	
Macedon	Shire of Macedon Ranges	37°24′36″S 144°33′51″E	Vicnames	
Maribyrnong	City of Brimbank	37°42′45″S 144°46′40″E	Vicnames	
Melbourne North	City of Yarra	37°47′59″S 144°58′46″E	Vicnames	
Melbourne South	City of Port Phillip	37°50′11″S 144°57′25″E	Vicnames	
Merriang	City of Whittlesea	37°28′46″S 145°00′27″E	Vicnames	
Merrimu	Shire of Moorabool	37°39′13″S 144°29′34″E	Vicnames	
Mickleham	City of Hume	37°32′26″S 144°53′50″E	Vicnames	
Monegeetta	Shire of Macedon Ranges	37°22′46″S 144°45′34″E	Vicnames	
Moorabbin	City of Kingston	37°56′29″S 145°02′30″E	Vicnames	
Moorarbool East	Shire of Moorabool	37°29′49″S 144°13′11″E	Vicnames	
Morang	City of Whittlesea	37°38′09″S 145°05′26″E	Vicnames	
Mordialloc	City of Kingston	37°57′32″S 145°07′15″E	Vicnames	
Mulgrave	City of Monash	37°53′18″S 145°08′52″E	Vicnames	
Myrniong	Shire of Moorabool	37°36′32″S 144°20′37″E	Vicnames	
Nunawading	City of Whitehorse	37°49′41″S 145°09′54″E	Vicnames	
Prahran	City of Glen Eira	37°52′38″S 145°02′28″E	Vicnames	
Pywheitjorrk	City of Melton	37°46′09″S 144°38′19″E	Vicnames	
Rochford	Shire of Macedon Ranges	37°18′44″S 144°40′53″E	Vicnames	
Springfield	Shire of Macedon Ranges	37°19′29″S 144°48′55″E	Vicnames	
Tarneit	City of Wyndham	37°50′47″S 144°40′38″E	Vicnames	
Toorourrong	City of Whittlesea	37°29′31″S 145°06′52″E	Vicnames	
Truganina	City of Hobsons Bay	37°51′01″S 144°47′06″E	Vicnames	
Tullamarine	City of Hume	37°40′33″S 144°50′45″E	Vicnames	
Wallan Wallan	Shire of Mitchell	37°25′22″S 145°03′43″E	Vicnames	
Will Will Rook	City of Hume	37°41′15″S 144°56′30″E	Vicnames	
Wollert	City of Whittlesea	37°37′28″S 145°00′05″E	Vicnames	
Yangardook	City of Melton	37°36′02″S 144°35′35″E	Vicnames	
Yuroke	City of Hume	37°36′53″S 144°54′35″E	Vicnames	

== See also ==
- Local government areas of Victoria
