= District Road Boards (Colony of Victoria) =

A Central Road Board and District Road Boards were established in the colony of Victoria, Australia, pursuant to the Roads Act given Royal Assent in February 1853. From this date many District Road Boards were created. District Road Boards were abolished in 1869.

== Governance structure ==
Under rules established in NSW in 1839 it became possible for a town in the Colony (which then included the Port Phillip District later Victoria) to establish a Market Commission. Elected Commissioners had the power to set the rules for the market and levy tolls to fund the system. A Market Commission was set up in the Port Phillip District with Commissioners elected from four wards. The first meeting was 8 November 1841. This governance structure, including the four wards, was transmuted into the Town of Melbourne Council in 1842.

The same approach was then applied to roads. In 1840 an Act allowed for a road Trust to be established. The Trust would have the right to levy tolls on the road and rates on the landowners within 5 km of the road. In 1841 the Heidelberg Road Trust was established.

In 1842 the Colonial Parliament in NSW used the same principles to establish District Councils. It was under this legislation that the Towns of Melbourne and Geelong were established. This mechanism did not work as well as had been hoped and a review in 1847 recommended the establishment of local road trusts (rather than District Councils) with responsibility for local or parish bridges and roads.

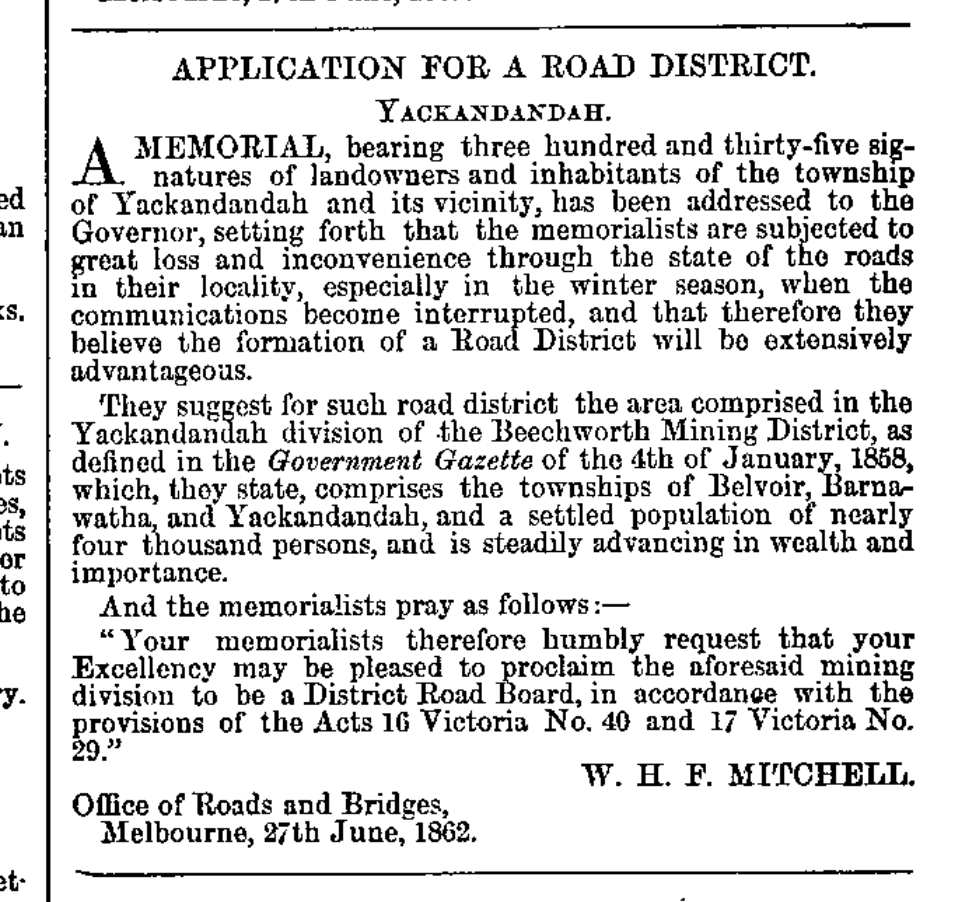
Application for a Road District

== Road districts ==
This approach was picked up by Victoria following Separation from NSW, and an Act was passed in 1853 to establish Road Districts.

The 1853 Roads Act authorised 'not less than five landholders and five householders in any road district in the colony' to begin the process.

Road Districts were established after public meetings to discuss issues such as boundaries and following a petition to the Lieutenant Governor. Upon the proclamation of a district a public meeting was held to elect officers of the District Road Board.

Once established, the elected District Road Board had the power to 'form, improve, contract, manage, and maintain new or existing parish or cross road, and any bridge theron (subject to the control of the Central Board)'. The District Board could 'describe the line' of a parish road. Control of main (not parish) roads was held by the Central Board. A further clause gave the Road District Board the power to 'fix rates of assessment to be chargeable upon owners and occupiers of land within the said district'.

These elected District Road Boards with powers to levy taxes and borrow money were an early form of local government in Victoria. Many areas that became Shires arose from areas originally established as Road Districts. The Shire of Yackandandah is an example.

== Other pathways ==
Alongside the District Road Boards, the Legislative Council opened other pathways to the governance model of election to a body that could levy rates and tolls. The Municipal Institutions Act 1854 allowed local government structures in urban areas. Through this Act, Richmond and East Collingwood for example, became municipalities in 1855.

The Road District and Shires Act 1863 permitted the same structure in rural areas. This Act provide a pathway for Road Boards to achieve municipal status by taking on additional responsibilities related to pounds, slaughtering licences, thistles, dogs, licensed publicans, brewer's and spirit merchants' licences and commons. Many Road Districts became Shires in 1864 (see table below).

The Local Government Act of 1874 applied the same rules to urban and rural municipalities. In 1877 local governments lost the power to levy tolls.

== Consequences ==
The organic or bottom-up approach allowed for in the Road District legislation enabled well-organised communities to quickly establish a mechanism for designing, improving and maintaining roads. It also enabled the central government to avoid the establishment of a central authority with the responsibility of determining suitable parish boundaries.

There were however negative consequences.

The boundaries that emerged were in some cases sub-optimal. In 1862, Hamilton was in the District of Dundas. Rather than being in the centre of Dundas, the town abutted the western boundary of the Road District and the neighbouring District of Portland. This meant that some of the westernmost residents of Hamilton were paying rates to Portland, 80 km to the west. A Hamilton newspaper said 'These distant ratepayers are entirely unrepresented. They live too far away to attend at the election meetings, and they have literally no voice in spending their own money, and the only thing which reminds them of the existence of the Board is the extreme regularity with which they are looked up for their rates.'

Another unintended consequence was fragmentation. When the Colonial Government announced road funding subsidies for communities that established Road Districts, there emerged 'quite an exciting race with the different districts who should be first in the field, so as to secure a share'. The Ovens & Murray Advertiser reported that following an application for District status from Yackandandah, the communities of Buckland, Rutherglen, Stanley and Indigo followed suit. Nonetheless, this left 'a very considerable territory still unappropriated'. This unclaimed area was divided between Stanley and Indigo. An effort then arose to split the Stanley district. This inspired succession movements in Reid's Creek, Woolshed Creek, El Dorado, Bowman's Forest, Tarrawingee, and a portion of Rutherglen. The newspaper made the point that the administration costs of each smaller District would be higher than in a more consolidated zone. They said that this constraint would mean that the salaries and competence of the officers would be lower. They noted that the central Government subsidy could not be applied to administrative costs. The newspaper marvelled at this 'parcelling out of the colony into districts of such lilliputian proportions'

The criticism of fragmentation was already being made a Government level. The 1863 Stuart Commission found that Victoria had too many local councils (54) with rate bases that were too small to enable them to fulfil their obligations. Similar reviews in 1873 and 1902-6 came to similar conclusions. Consolidation on a statewide basis occurred in 1994

Road Districts included:

Name	Date proclaimed	Notes	Succeeded by (original LGAs)	Date
Barrabool	1853		Shire of Barrabool	1865
Portarlington	1853		Shire of Bellarine	1865
Belfast (Port Fairy)	1854		Shire of Belfast	1863
Boroondara (Hawthorn, Camberwell, Kew)	1854		Shire of Boroondara	1871
Epping	1854		Shire of Darebin	1870
Hawthorne	Proclaimed 16 January 1854	Revoked 11 May 1854. Subsumed in Boroondara Road District	Hawthorn municipal district	1860
Warrnambool	1854		Shire of Warrnambool	1863
Alberton	1855		Shire of Alberton	1864
Lower Leigh	1855			
Bacchus Marsh	1856		Bacchus Marsh and Maddingley Road District	1862
Connewarre	1856	Amalgamated with South Barwon Borough	Shire of South Barwon	1874
Gardiner	1856		Shire of Gardiner	1871
Portland	1856		Shire of Portland	1863
Templestowe	1856		Shire of Bulleen	1875
Upper Yarra	1856			
Ballarat	1857		Shire of Ballarat	1863
Broadmeadows	1857		Shire of Broadmeadows	1871
Caulfield	1857		Shire of Caulfield	1871
Dandenong	1857		Shire of Dandenong	1873
Dundas	1857		Shire of Dundas	1863
Eltham	1857		Shire of Eltham	1871
Great Brighton	1858			
Hampden and Heytesbury	1857	named from the counties	Shire of Hampden	1863
Nunawading	1857		Shire of Nunawading	1872
South Barwon	1857		Borough of South Barwon	1863
Willowmavin	1857			
Buninyong	1858		Shire of Buninyong	1864
Colac	1859		Shire of Colac	1864
Creswick	1858		Shire of Creswick	1863
Flinders	1868		Shire of Flinders & Kangerong	1874
Oakleigh and Mulgrave	1858		Shire of Oakleigh	1871
Woodstock	1858		Shire of Darebin	1870
Greensborough	1859	United with...	Shire of Heidelberg	1875
Pentridge	1859		Coburg Road District	1869
Upper Plenty	1859			
Amherst and Clunes	1860		Shire of Talbot	1865
Braybrook	1860		Shire of Braybrook	1871
Campaspe	1860		Shire of Huntly	1866
Cranbourne	1860		Shire of Cranbourne	1868
Fryers	1860		Mount Alexander United Shire	1871
Gisborne	1860		Shire of Gisborne	1871
Glenlyon	1860		Shire of Glenlyon	1865
Heidelberg	1860		Shire of Heidelberg	1871
Lexton	1860		Shire of Lexton	1864
Metcalfe	1860		Shire of Metcalfe	1865
Mortlake	1860		Shire of Mortlake	1864
Mount Eliza	1860		Shire of Mornington	1871
Mount Rouse	1860		Shire of Mount Rouse	1864
Newstead	1860		Shire of Newstead	1865
Tullaroop	1860		Shire of Tullaroop	1865
Winchelsea	1860		Shire of Winchelsea	1864
Yandoit and Franklin	1860		Shire of Mount Franklin	1871
Carngham	1861		Carngham and Beaufort Road District	1863
Strathfieldsaye	1861		Shire of Strathfieldsaye	1866
Marong	1861		Shire of Marong	1864
Corio	1861			
Ararat	1861		Shire of Ararat	1864
Avoca	1861		Shire of Avoca	1864
Bet Bet	1861		Shire of Bet Bet	1864
Grenville	1861		Shire of Grenville	1864
Leigh	1861		Shire of Leigh	1864
Ripon	1861		Shire of Ripon	1863
Shelford	1861			
Stawell	1861		Shire of Stawell	1864
St Arnaud	1861		Shire of St Arnaud	1864
Woady Yallock	1861			
Woodend, Newham and Rochford	1861		Shire of Newham	1871
Bacchus Marsh and Maddingley	1862			
Ballan	1862		Shire of Ballan	1864
Bannockburn	1862		Shire of Bannockburn	1864
Berwick	1862		Shire of Berwick	1868
Bulla	1862		Shire of Bulla	1866
Campbell's Creek	1862		Mount Alexander United Shire	1871
Chiltern	1862		Shire of Chiltern	1874
Horsham	1862			
Kangerong	1862		Shire of Flinders & Kangerong	1874
Kingower and Wedderburne	1862			
Korong	1862		Shire of Korong	1864
Kowree	1862		Shire of Kowree	1872
Melton	1862		Shire of Melton	1871
Moorabbin	1862		Shire of Moorabbin	1871
Oxley	1862		Shire of Oxley	1865
Romsey	1862		Shire of Romsey	1871
Rutherglen	1862		Shire of Rutherglen	1871
Swan Hill	1862		Shire of Swan Hill	1871
Whittlesea	1862		Shire of Whittlesea	1874
Wyndham	1862		Shire of Wyndham	1864
Yackandandah	1862		Shire of Yackandandah	1864
Baringhup	1863		Shire of Maldon	
Bungaree	1863		Shire of Bungaree	1871
Carngham and Beaufort	1863	previously Carngham		
Donnybrook, Wallan Wallan and Bylands	1863		Shire of Merriang	
Glenelg	1863		Shire of Glenelg	1864
Keilor	1863		Shire of Keilor	1871
Maldon	1863		Shire of Maldon	1864
Malvern	1863		Shire of Malvern	1878
McIvor	1863		Shire of McIvor	1864
North Ovens	1863		Shire of North Ovens	1867
Pyalong	1863		Shire of Pyalong	1871
Seymour	1863		Shire of Seymour	1871
Waranga	1863		Shire of Waranga	1865
Avon	1864		Shire of Avon	1865
East Loddon	1864		Shire of East Loddon	1871
Echuca	1864		Shire of Echuca	1871
Kyneton	1864	Amalgamation of Kyneton Borough and Lauriston & Edgecombe, Tylden & Trentham and Carlsruhe RDs	Shire of Kyneton	1865
Bairnsdale	1867		Shire of Bairnsdale	1868
Alexandra	1868		Shire of Alexandra	1869
Benalla	1868		Shire of Benalla	1869
Goulburn	1868		Shire of Goulburn	1871
Broadford	1869		Shire of Broadford	1875
Coburg	1869	renaming of Pentridge	Shire of Coburg	1875
Howqua	1869		Shire of Howqua	1875
Rosedale	1869		Shire of Rosedale	1871
Towong	1869		Shire of Towong	1874
Yea	1869		Shire of Yea	1873
Phillip Island	1871		Shire of Phillip Island and Woolamai	1874
Morang			Shire of Darebin	1870
Lauriston and Edgecombe			Kyneton Road District	1864
Tylden and Trentham			Kyneton Road District	1864
Carlsruhe			Kyneton Road District	1864
Bylands and Glenburnie				
Carisbrook				
Heathcote				
Indented Heads				
Indigo				
Lancefield				
Meredith				
North Harrow				
Wooragee				
