= Beenak =

- Town
- Coordinates: 37°51′S 145°42′E
- Country: Australia
- State: Victoria
- LGA: Shire of Yarra Ranges

Government
  - State electorate: Eildon
  - Federal division: Casey

Population
  - Total: 17 (2021 census)
- Postcode: 3799

Beenak is a locality in Victoria, Australia, to the north of the Bunyip State Park, located within the Shire of Yarra Ranges local government area. Beenak recorded a population of 17 at the 2021 census.

== History ==
Beenak Post Office opened on 1 July 1878 and closed in 1951.
