= Shire of McIvor =

Coordinates: 36°55′S 144°42′E

Shire of McIvor Victoria
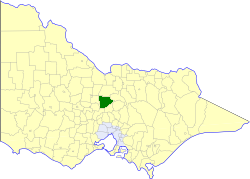
- Location in Victoria
- The Shire of McIvor as at its dissolution in 1994
- Population: 3,450 (1992)
  - Density: 2.664/km^{2} (6.900/sq mi)
- Established: 1863
- Area: 1,295 km^{2} (500.0 sq mi)
- Council seat: Heathcote
- Region: North Central Victoria
- County: Dalhousie, Rodney
LGAs around Shire of McIvor:
Huntly	Waranga	Goulburn
Strathfieldsaye	Shire of McIvor	Goulburn
Metcalfe	Kyneton	Pyalong

The Shire of McIvor was a local government area about 110 kilometres (68 mi) north of Melbourne, the state capital of Victoria, Australia. The shire covered an area of 1,295 square kilometres (500.0 sq mi), and existed from 1863 until 1994.

== History ==
McIvor was incorporated as a road district on 26 June 1863, and became a shire on 23 December 1864.

The Borough of Heathcote was created around the town of Heathcote in August 1859, but was reannexed as the Central Riding on 27 May 1892. Part of the East Riding was annexed to the Shire of Goulburn on 16 May 1956.

On 18 November 1994, the Shire of McIvor was abolished, with most of its area, including Heathcote, transferring into the City of Greater Bendigo, which was created earlier in April 1994. The Graytown district was transferred into the newly created Shire of Strathbogie, while the Mia Mia and Tooborac districts were transferred into the newly created Shire of Mitchell.

== Wards ==
The Shire of McIvor was divided into four ridings on 16 May 1956, each of which elected three councillors:

- Centre Riding
- East Riding
- North West Riding
- South West Riding

== Towns and localities ==
- Argyle
- Costerfield
- Derrinal
- Glenhope
- Graytown
- Heathcote*
- Knowsley
- Mia Mia
- Redcastle
- Tooborac

* Council seat.

== Population ==
Year	Population
1954	2,201
1958	2,180*
1961	2,140
1966	1,889
1971	1,789
1976	1,858
1981	2,140
1986	2,555
1991	3,182

* Estimate in the 1958 Victorian Year Book.
