= Thornton, Victoria =

Thornton
- Town
- Coordinates: 37°15′S 145°48′E
- Country: Australia
- State: Victoria
- Region: Hume
- LGA: Shire of Murrindindi
- Location: 131 km (81 mi) from Melbourne; 17 km (11 mi) from Alexandra; 13 km (8.1 mi) from Eildon

Government
  - State electorate: Eildon
  - Federal division: Indi
- Elevation: 200 m (660 ft)

Population
  - Total: 311 (2021 census)
- Postcode: 3712

Thornton is a town in the Shire of Murrindindi, Victoria, Australia, located on the Goulburn River. The town is approximately halfway between Alexandra and Eildon. The town had a population of 311 at the 2021 census.

== History ==
The locality was named after a nearby pastoral run called Thornton Run that was established in 1840.

Thornton Post Office opened on 22 August 1914, which has been operated from multiple locations such as the caravan park, general store and the pub.

== Sport ==
The Thornton-Eildon District Football & Netball Club play their home games on the Thornton recreation reserve. The club competes in the Outer East Football Netball League.

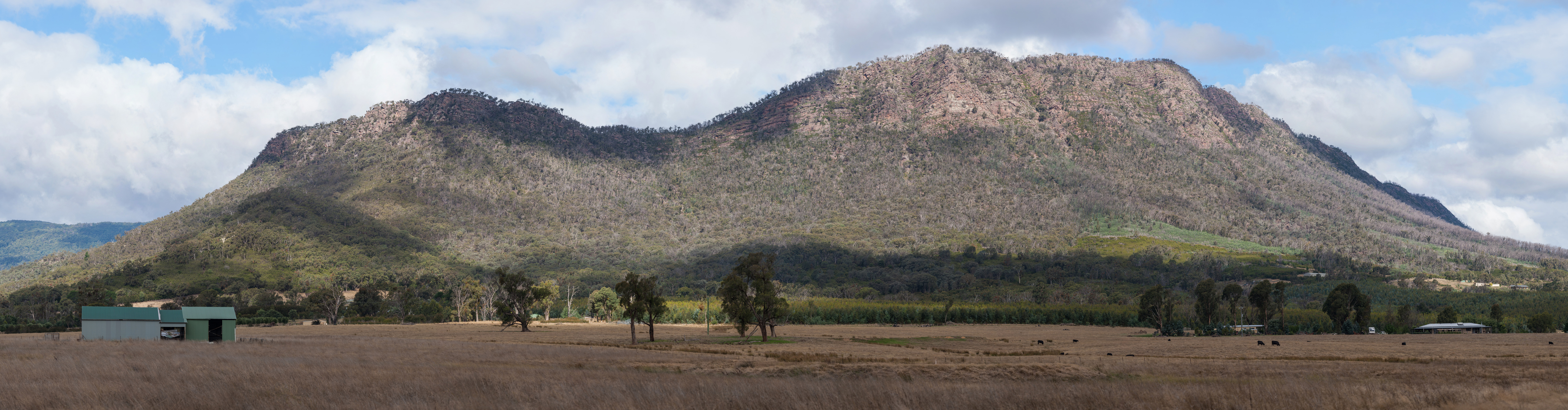
The northern section of the Cathedral Range as viewed from the west on Maroondah Highway.
