= Murrindindi =

- Town
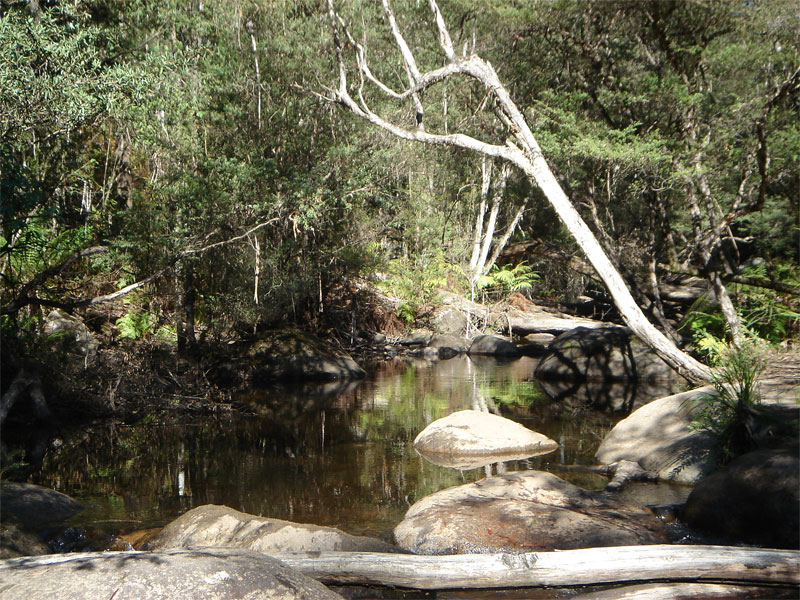
- The Murrindindi River flows through the town

- Coordinates: 37°23′25″S 145°34′40″E
- Country: Australia
- State: Victoria
- Region: Hume
- LGA: Shire of Murrindindi
- Location: 101 km (63 mi) NE of Melbourne; 55 km (34 mi) SE of Seymour; 17 km (11 mi) SE of Yea

Government
  - State electorate: Eildon
  - Federal division: Indi

Population
  - Total: 114 (2021 census)
- Postcode: 3717

Murrindindi is a locality along the valley of the Murrindindi River in Victoria, in eastern Australia in the Murrindindi local government area. The nearest town is Yea. At the 2021 census, the suburb of Murrindindi had a population of 114.

== Location and history ==
The name comes from the pastoral run begun by squatter Peter Snodgrass in 1837, which was originally (and probably correctly) spelled Murrundindi. In the Woiwurrung language of central Victoria the name means "living in the mountains". However, the inaccurate translation "mist of the mountains" is sometimes given.

Snodgrass's station covered the area from the present-day town of Yea up the valleys of the east and west branches of the Muddy Creek, now the Yea River. His homestead was near the junction of these two branches, therefore surveyors named the east branch Murrindindi Creek, now the Murrindindi River.

There has never been a Murrindindi town. The gold rush town of Higinbotham (began 1868, lasted for a few years, now completely vanished) with a maximum of 200 residents was the nearest to a town that the valley has seen. Modern maps place the name Murrindindi at the site where the War Memorial Hall once stood (now a public reserve) or a little further to the south on Cummins Lane where the local volunteer fire station is situated. In the late 19th and early 20th centuries these would have been called Lower Murrindindi, and Upper Murrindindi was the locality now called Woodbourne and adjacent areas up the Ault Beag Creek. Ault Beag (Gaelic for "little creek") was named by an early Scots settler, Duncan McLeish.

Farming and timber were the main industries of the area when the British settled the valley, and remain so today. Although much of the area was deforested by the timber industry, regrowth and sustainable logging techniques have restored the forests to some semblance of their former beauty, with management today as the Black Range State Forest. Tourism (trail-bike riding, fishing etc.) and sightseeing (rapids on the Murrindindi River, and the Wilhelmina Falls on a tributary) activities are carried on in the forest areas.

== Recent developments ==
Since the 1990s there has been a considerable growth in the number of vineyards in the valley, which is in the Upper Goulburn wine region of Victoria. These grow cabernet sauvignon, merlot, pinot noir and chardonnay grapes, primarily for wineries outside the area (and the grapes are usually labelled "Yea Valley"), but Cuthbertson's Murrindindi and Sedona are two local vineyard/winery labels.

On 7 February 2009 a fire started at the old abandoned Murrindindi timber mill which spread to become one of the major conflagrations known as Black Saturday. Although there were no human casualties at Murrindindi, many people died further away at Marysville and Narbethong.
