= Narbethong, Victoria =

Town in Victoria, Australia

Narbethong
- Town
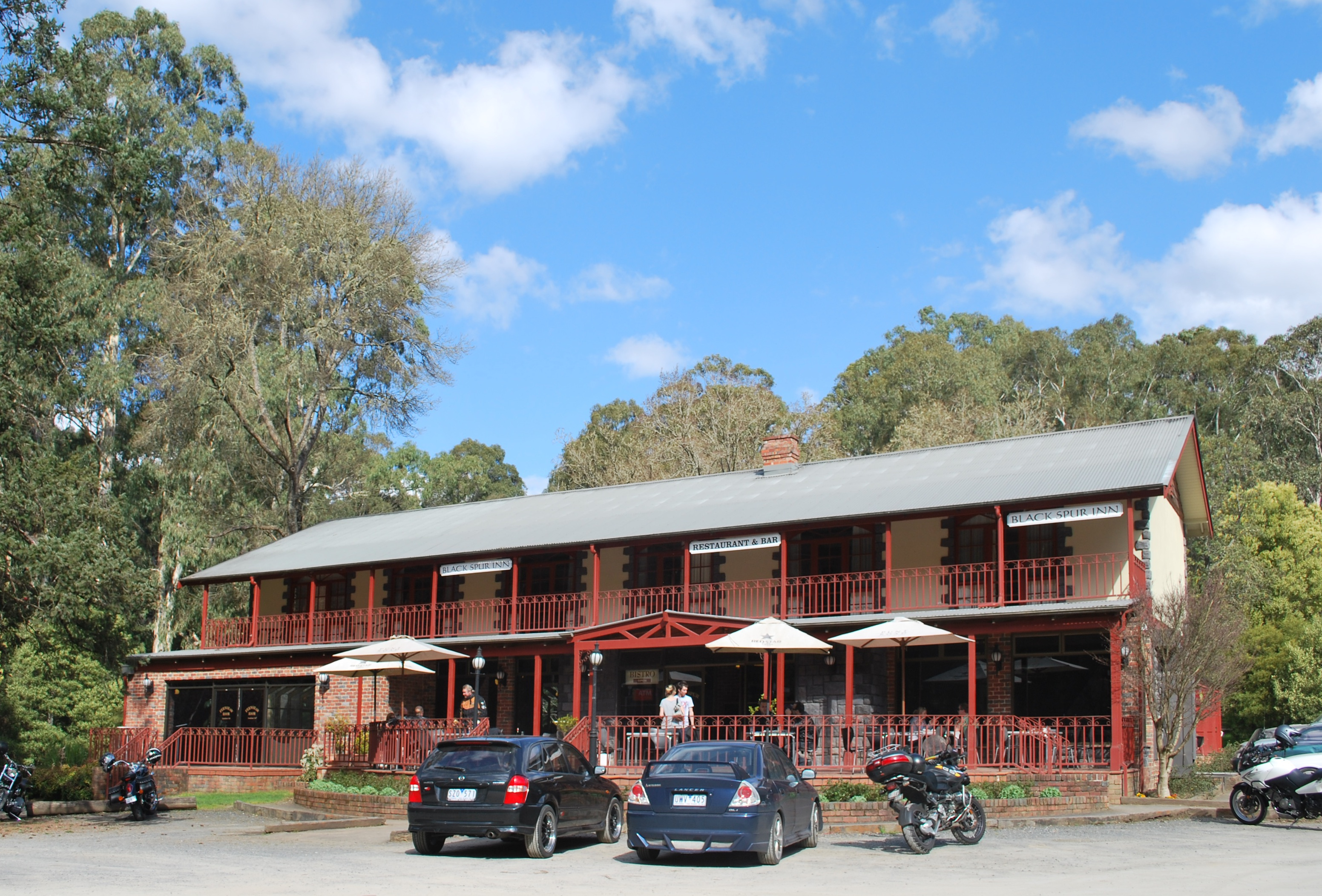
- Black Spur Inn at Narbethong

- Interactive map of Narbethong
- Coordinates: 37°34′S 145°39′E
- Country: Australia
- State: Victoria
- Region: Hume
- LGA: Shire of Murrindindi
- Location: 87 km (54 mi) NE of Melbourne

Government
  - State electorate: Eildon
  - Federal division: Indi
- Elevation: 360 m (1,180 ft)

Population
  - Total: 201 (2021 census)
- Postcode: 3778
- Mean max temp: 15.8 °C (60.4 °F)
- Mean min temp: 7.5 °C (45.5 °F)
- Annual rainfall: 1,365 mm (53.7 in)
Localities around Narbethong
Glenburn	Buxton	Marysville
Toolangi	Narbethong	Cambarville
Healesville	Warburton	McMahons Creek

Narbethong is a town in central Victoria, Australia. It is located on the Maroondah Highway, 87 kilometres (54 mi) north east of the state capital, Melbourne. At the 2021 census, Narbethong had a population of 201.

== History ==
The first European settlement at Narbethong was established in about 1865 by Frederick Fisher. Fisher built a 12-room hotel, the Black Spur Inn, on the road which was being built to link Melbourne with the new goldfield at Woods Point. Fisher came from the town of Narberth in Wales, so it is likely that the name Narbethong was based on that. However, there are also claims that Narbethong is an Aboriginal word meaning cheerful, or cheerful place.

Narbethong Post Office opened on 16 October 1883 in a small room at the hotel. In about 1886 the post office moved from the hotel into a small building. The telegraph service was connected to Narbethong in 1891, with the wires being strung along fences and attached to trees. In 1939 the post office building, which was then part of a store and petrol station, was completely destroyed in the Black Friday bushfires. The Post Office closed in 1993.

A primary school opened in Narbethong on 7 July 1903. It originally was part-time, sharing a teacher with Marysville and Buxton. In 1913, the Healesville Shire health officer reported that a lack of ventilation made the building a health hazard for students and teachers. A new school building was officially opened by Lord Huntingfield, the Governor of Victoria, on 9 April 1937.

The town was devastated in the Black Friday bushfires in 1939. Initial reports suggested that the hotel was the only building left standing. but other buildings survived including the school and The Hermitage.

Narbethong was again severely affected by the Black Saturday bushfires in 2009. In 2011, a new public hall was built using local timbers, with the whole building being wrapped in a bronze mesh fire resistant screen. It was officially opened on 26 November 2011 by the Governor of Victoria, Alex Chernov.

A scene in the 1959 film On the Beach was set in Narbethong. It featured the characters played by Gregory Peck and Ava Gardner spending their first night together.
