= County of Anglesey, Victoria =

Coordinates: 37°25′S 145°30′E

Anglesey
- Cadastral division
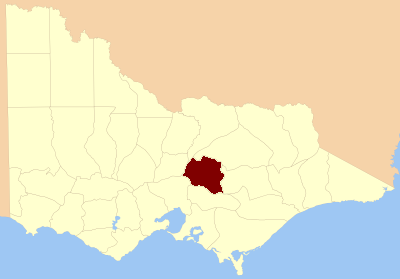
- Location in Victoria
- Country: Australia
- State: Victoria
- Established: 10 January 1849

Area
  - Total: 4,266 km^{2} (1,647 sq mi)
Lands administrative divisions around Anglesey
Moira	Delatite	Delatite
Dalhousie	Anglesey	Wonnangatta
Bourke	Evelyn	Evelyn

The County of Anglesey is one of the 37 counties of Victoria which are part of the cadastral divisions of Australia, used for land titles. It is located to the east of Seymour, on both sides of the Goulburn River. The county was proclaimed in 1849.

== Parishes ==
Parishes include:

- Acheron, Victoria
- Alexandra, Victoria
- Banyarmbite, Victoria
- Billian, Victoria
- Buxton, Victoria
- Derril, Victoria
- Dropmore, Victoria (also in Delatite)
- Eildon, Victoria
- Flowerdale, Victoria
- Ghin Ghin, Victoria
- Glendale, Victoria
- Gobur, Victoria
- Granton, Victoria
- Kerrisdale, Victoria
- Killingworth, Victoria
- Kobyboyn, Victoria
- Maintongoon, Victoria
- Mangalore, Victoria
- Merton, Victoria (also in Delatite)
- Mohican, Victoria
- Molesworth, Victoria
- Murrindindi, Victoria
- Nar-be-thong, Victoria (also in Evelyn)
- Niagaroon, Victoria
- Steavenson, Victoria
- Switzerland, Victoria
- Taggerty, Victoria
- Tallarook, Victoria
- Thornton, Victoria
- Traawool, Victoria
- Whanregarwen, Victoria
- Windham, Victoria
- Woodbourne, Victoria
- Worrough, Victoria
- Yarck, Victoria
- Yea, Victoria
