= County of Evelyn, Victoria =

Coordinates: 37°45′S 145°30′E

Evelyn Victoria
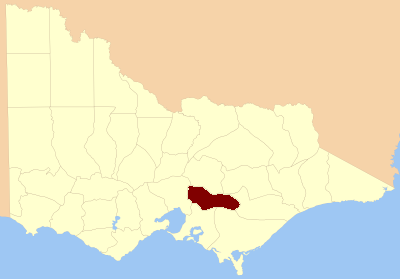
- Location in Victoria
- Established: 10 January 1849
- Area: 3,036 km^{2} (1,172.2 sq mi)
Lands administrative divisions around Evelyn:
| Bourke | Anglesey | Wonnangatta |
| Bourke | Evelyn | Tanjil |
| Mornington | Buln Buln | Buln Buln |

The County of Evelyn is one of the 37 counties of Victoria which are part of the cadastral divisions of Australia, used for land titles. It is located to the east of Melbourne, on both sides of the upper reaches of the Yarra River in the Yarra Valley. The Great Dividing Range is the boundary to the north. The county was proclaimed in 1849, and is named after John Evelyn, a famous diarist and gardener.

== Parishes ==
Parishes include:

- Beenak, Victoria
- Brimbonga, Victoria
- Burgoyne, Victoria
- Coornburt, Victoria
- Galbarmuck, Victoria
- Glenwatts, Victoria
- Gracedale, Victoria
- Greensborough, Victoria
- Gruyere, Victoria
- Kinglake, Victoria
- Linton, Victoria
- Manango, Victoria
- Monbulk, Victoria
- Monda, Victoria
- Mooroolbark, Victoria
- Nangana, Victoria
- Nillumbik, Victoria
- Parbine, Victoria
- Queenstown, Victoria
- Sutton, Victoria
- Tarrawarra, Victoria
- Tarrawarra North, Victoria
- Wandin Yallock, Victoria
- Warburton, Victoria
- Warrandyte, Victoria
- Woori Yallock, Victoria
- Yering, Victoria
- Yuonga, Victoria

== See also ==
- Vicnames, place name details
- Research aids, Victoria 1910
- Map of the counties of Evelyn, Tanjil, Buln-Buln 1886, National Library of Australia
