= County of Dalhousie, Victoria =

Coordinates: 36°59′S 144°50′E

Dalhousie
- Cadastral division
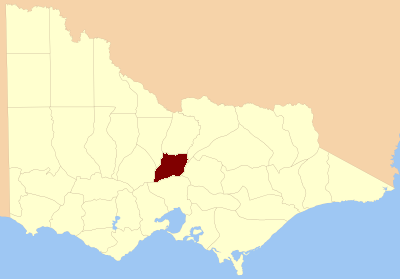
- Location in Victoria
- Country: Australia
- State: Victoria
- Established: 10 January 1849

Area
  - Total: 3,393 km^{2} (1,310 sq mi)
Lands administrative divisions around Dalhousie
Bendigo	Rodney	Moira
Talbot	Dalhousie	Anglesey
Bourke	Bourke	Anglesey

The County of Dalhousie is one of the 37 counties of Victoria which are part of the cadastral divisions of Australia, used for land titles. It is located to the north of Melbourne. It is bounded by the Coliban River to the west. The Goulburn River forms part of the boundary to the north-east. Puckapunyal is on its northern edge, and Kilmore and Woodend on its southern edge. The county was proclaimed in 1849.

== Parishes ==
Parishes include:

- Baynton, Victoria
- Broadford, Victoria
- Bylands, Victoria
- Carlsrhue, Victoria
- Clonbinane, Victoria
- Cobaw, Victoria
- Costerfield, Victoria (Partially in Rodney)
- Edgecombe, Victoria
- Emberton, Victoria
- Glenaroua, Victoria
- Glenburnie, Victoria
- Glenhope, Victoria
- Heathcote, Victoria
- Lancefield, Victoria
- Langley, Victoria
- Langwornor, Victoria
- Lauriston, Victoria
- Lowry, Victoria (Partially in Anglesey)
- Metcalfe, Victoria
- Mitchell, Victoria
- Moormbool East, Victoria
- Moormbool West, Victoria
- Moranding, Victoria
- Newham, Victoria
- Northwood, Victoria
- Panyule, Victoria
- Puckapunyal, Victoria
- Pyalong, Victoria
- Redesdale, Victoria
- Seymour, Victoria (Partially in Anglesey)
- Springplains, Victoria
- Tooborac, Victoria
- Trentham, Victoria
- Tylden, Victoria
- Warrowitue, Victoria
- Willowmavin, Victoria
- Woodend, Victoria
