= Sugarloaf Creek, Victoria =

Sugarloaf Creek
- Region
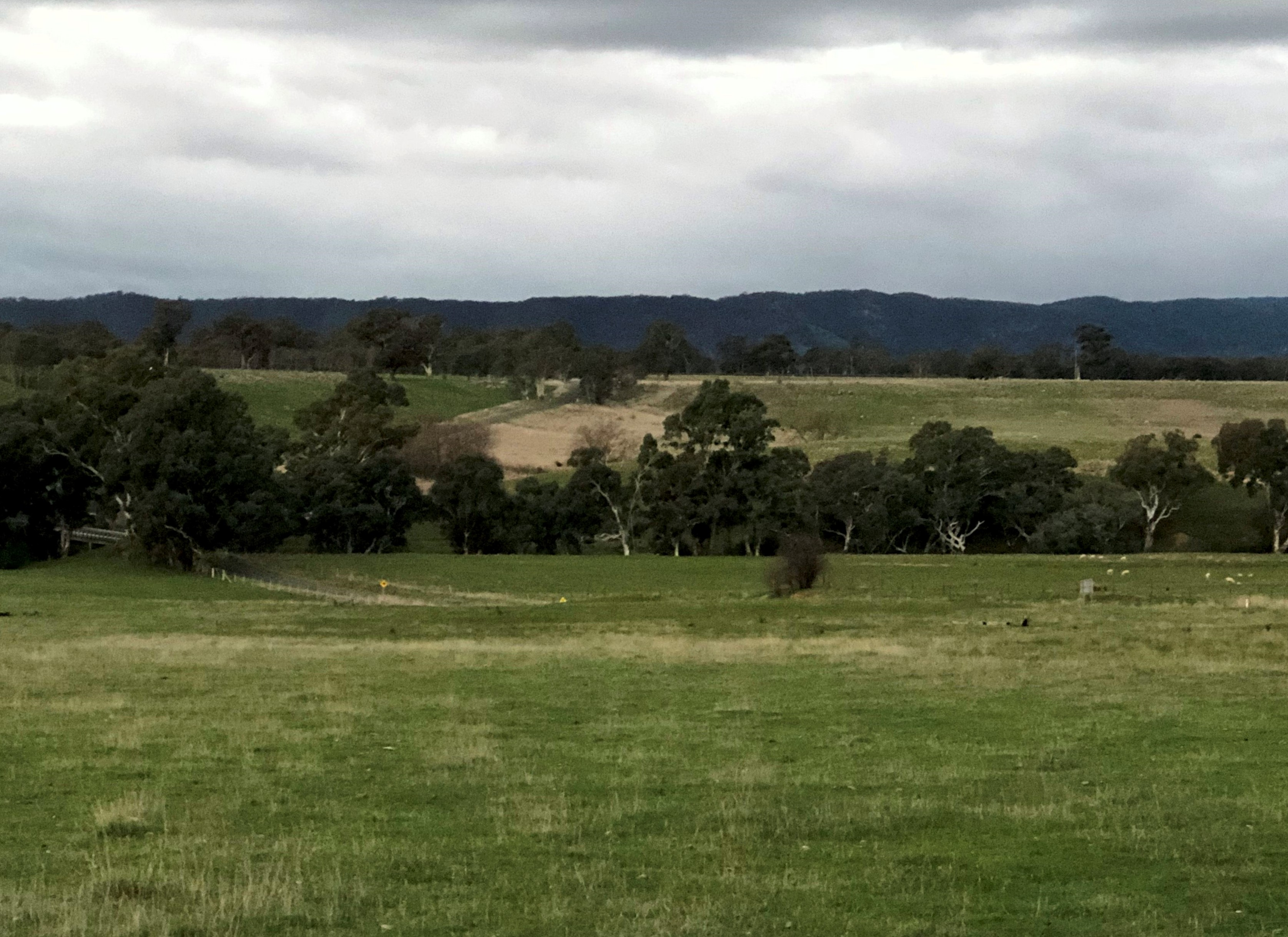
- Sugarloaf Creek Ebden Station

- Coordinates: 37°05′04″S 145°02′01″E
- Country: Australia
- State: Victoria
- Region: Hume
- LGA: Shire of Mitchell
- Location: 99 km (62 mi) N of Melbourne; 97 km (60 mi) SE of Bendigo; 27 km (17 mi) N of Kilmore

Government
  - State electorate: Euroa
  - Federal division: Nicholls

Population
  - Total: 244 (2016 census)
- Postcode: 3658
Regions around Sugarloaf Creek
Glenaroua	Hilldene	Tallarook
Glenaroua	Sugarloaf Creek	Tallarook
Pyalong	Broadford	Broadford

Sugarloaf Creek is a locality in central Victoria, Australia. It is located on the Sugarloaf Creek Road in the Shire of Mitchell local government area, 99 kilometres (62 mi) from the state capital, Melbourne. At the 2016 Australian Census Sugarloaf Creek had a population of 257. The Sugarloaf Creek itself is a tributary of the Goulburn River in Australia.

The traditional owners of Sugarloaf Creek are the Taungurung people, a part of the Kulin nation that inhabited a large portion of central Victoria including Port Phillip Bay and its surrounds.

Charles Hotson Ebden and Charles Bonney drove 10,000 sheep from Mungabareena station on the Murray on 1 March 1837 and reached Sugarloaf Creek station on about 14 March 1837. They set up their first sheep station adjacent to the intersection of Seymour Pyalong Road with Tallarook Pyalong Road, 37°05’04" S; 145°02’41" E.

Sugarloaf Creek has the distinction of being the site of the first settlement in inland Victoria by overlanders from New South Wales, a sheep station, and subsequently the generator of the second and third such settlements in inland Victoria at Carlsruhe and Kilmore.

William Hamilton took up the Sugarloaf Creek station after Ebden and remained there for the rest of his life.
