= Hume's Pass =

Historic place in Victoria, Australia

Hume’s Pass
- Region
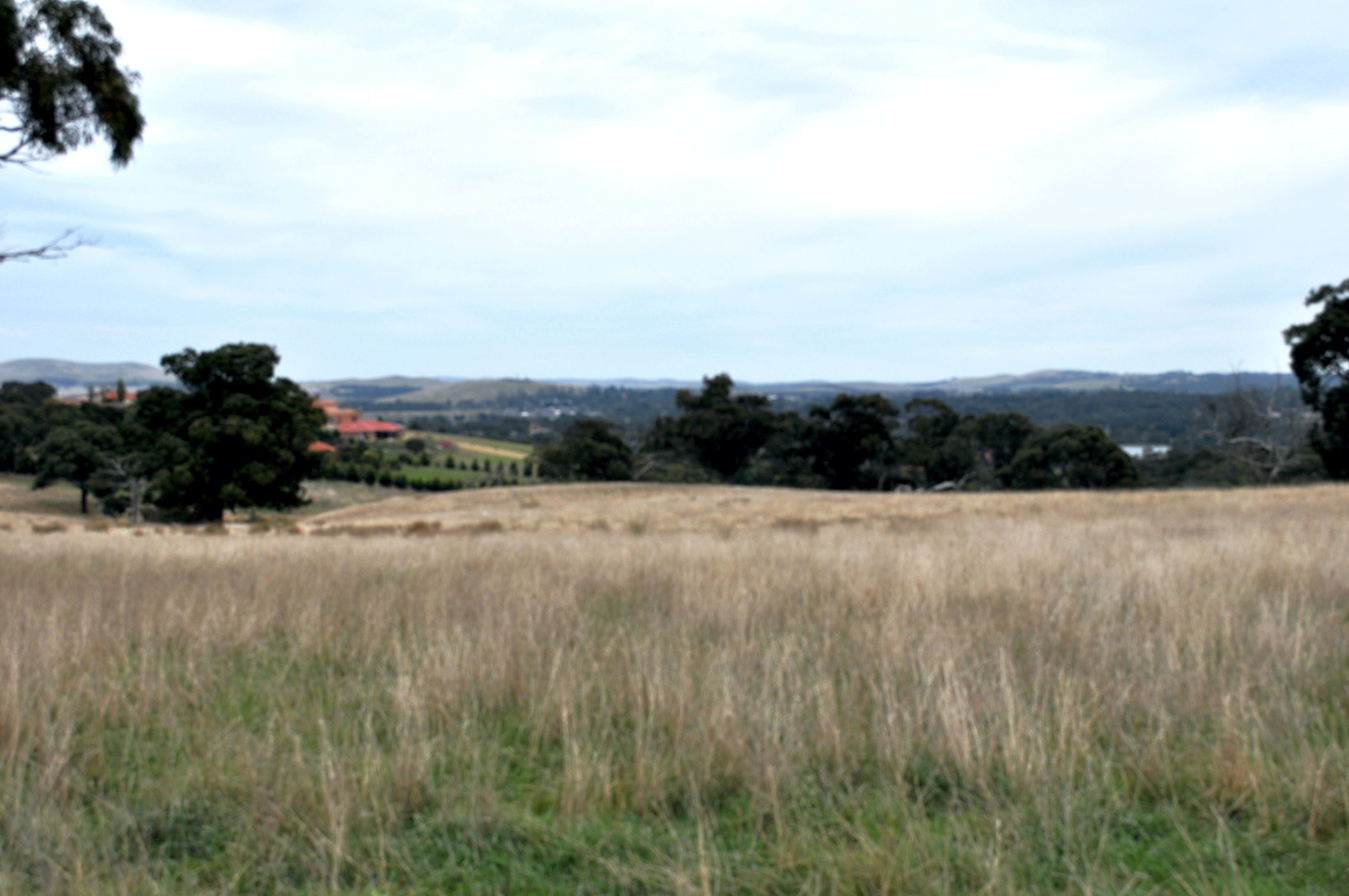

- Coordinates: 37°23′11″S 145°00′48″E
- Country: Australia
- State: Victoria
- LGA: Shire of Mitchell
- Location: 53 km (33 mi) N of Melbourne; 94 km (58 mi) SE of Bendigo; 14 km (8.7 mi) S of Kilmore

Government
  - State electorate: Euroa
  - Federal division: McEwen

Population
  - Total: 244 (2016 census)
- Postcode: 3758
Regions around Hume’s Pass
Kilmore	Wandong	Strath Creek
Bylands	Hume’s Pass	Mt Disappointment
Wallan	Wallan East	Kinglake

Hume’s Pass is a low pass on the Great Dividing Range in central Victoria, Australia. It is located at Wandong in the Shire of Mitchell local government area, 53 kilometres (33 mi) from the state capital, Melbourne.

The traditional owners of Hume’s Pass are the Taungurung people, a part of the Kulin nation that inhabited a large portion of central Victoria including Port Phillip Bay and its surrounds.

== History ==
Hume’s Pass was discovered and named by Hamilton Hume and Captain William Hilton Hovell on 13 December 1824 during the first European journey through inland Victoria. It enabled them to break through over the top of the Great Dividing Range. Hovell described its location clearly in his journal of that day.

However, a map produced by Hume had an error in it leading to uncertainty about its true location for 197 years.

The route recorded by Hume and Hovell from the nearby town of Broadford to Hume’s Pass, was shown approximately in an 1857 map from the Surveyor General’s Department of Victoria.

The approximate route was shown again in 1924 during major celebrations for the centenary of the Hume and Hovell journey.

Finally, an old settler’s trail across the exact location of Hume’s Pass was shown in 1930 on the Victorian Army Survey map of that year without it being acknowledged.

The independent Royal Historical Society of Victoria demonstrated in its double-blind refereed journal in 2021 how to correct the error in the Hume map and thus revealed the true location to be 1260 metres south of Arkell’s Lane Wandong.

Hume’s Pass still has not been officially named after two centuries, unlike other places first named by Hume and Hovell.
