= Sunday Creek =

Sunday Creek may refer to:

- Sunday Creek (Ohio), a tributary of the Hocking River in south-eastern Ohio, United States
- Sunday Creek (Green River tributary), a stream in Washington, United States
- Sunday Creek, Victoria, locality in Victoria, Australia

== See also ==
- Sunday River (disambiguation)
