= Mount Disappointment (Australia) =

Mountain in Victoria, Australia

- Location within Victoria

Highest point
- Elevation: 800 m (2,600 ft)
- Coordinates: 37°25′37″S 145°8′11″E

Geography
- Location: Victoria, Australia
- Parent range: Hume Range, Great Dividing Range

Climbing
- First ascent: 1824 by explorers Hume and Hovell

Mount Disappointment is an 800-metre (2,600 ft) mountain on the southern end of the Great Dividing Range, 9.5 kilometres (5.9 mi) north of Whittlesea and 60 kilometres (37 mi) north of Melbourne, the state capital of Victoria, Australia. It was named by explorers Hume and Hovell in 1824, and is now a popular hiking spot.

Mount Disappointment is the main water source of the Yan Yean Reservoir, which is in turn one of the major water supply reserves of Melbourne.

== History ==
=== Encounter by Europeans ===
Aboriginal Australians are known to have lived in the Mount Disappointment area. Stone weapons have been found near the junction of Drag Hill and Sunday Creeks.

The surrounding forest was the land of the Kulin nation.

After making the arduous climb to the summit in 1824, British explorers Hume and Hovell hoped to view the distant Port Phillip Bay. However, the mountain's dense vegetation prevented them reaching the summit (they got within 5 kilometres), resulting in their immense disappointment. In addition, Hume suffered a painful injury to his groin nearby which caused him much distress and necessitated a five-day rest for their party. Consequently, they recorded their feelings in the name they chose for the mountain.

=== Economic development ===
In 1870, Australian settlers began mining for gold at Mount Disappointment. In 1880, the Australian Seasoned Timber Company commenced timber cutting and sawmilling operations there and with an influx of workers, townships were soon created at Clonbinane, Reedy Creek and Strath Creek. The company operated two mills, named "Comet Mill" and "Planet Mill", located in the heart of the forest. A network of tramways carried logs to the mills for cutting. These tramways included a notorious section called "The Bump", a steep incline that required a winch to haul the solid hardwood logs. By the 1890s, the Comet sawmill was processing 800 mountain ash logs a month.

In 1883–1885, the catchments to the east of Mount Disappointment were captured by Toorourrong Reservoir and associated aqueducts. They are protected as part of Kinglake National Park.

The Australian Seasoned Timber Company's finishing and seasoning works were located in the township of Wandong, north of Melbourne on the edge of the Mount Disappointment forest. This seasoning plant treated messmate timber, used principally for furniture making. The Wandong seasoning works were established by a different company in 1889 and were one of the earliest attempts to season hardwood in Australia.

At its peak, the timber industry in the area employed 420 men. Sawmilling ceased in 1939 but timber from the Mount Disappointment area is still being logged today, with improvements to forest management ensuring long-term sustainability of the industry.

=== World War II prison camps ===
In 1940, during World War II, prisoner of war camps were established to house alien internees and Italian prisoners of war. These prisoners were put to work clearing land around Mount Disappointment and constructing roads. At the end of the war, the camps were abandoned and all but one of the main huts were removed from the No.1 camp. After the end of the war, the camp housed displaced Polish and Hungarian people who were authorized to stay there up to two years.

The site resembles a large cleared area of about five acres, with evidence of buildings, the remains of a tennis court and cricket pitch. The site is now used as a picnic ground.

On 5 August 1942, a Bristol Beaufighter IC crashed into the mountain, three hundred yards north of the peak, killing two men from 30 Squadron RAAF.

In 1944, two RAAF Vultee Vengeance Mk1 dive bombers were flying in formation when both crashed into the mountain, killing all five airmen on board. Low cloud was reported at the time.

=== Recent history ===
The Mount Disappointment Forest was hit by a major fire in 1982, and again in 2009.

In 2004, the police went undercover to follow jihad terrorists who went to the Mount Disappointment Forest to blow up ammonium nitrate bombs as training practice.

In April 2017, three tired hikers called the emergency services as they were stranded in the middle of the Mount Disappointment Forest. 30 emergency service workers were mobilized, and the lost hikers were quickly found. The cost of this unusual rescue was estimated to be more than $10,000 per hiker.

In June 2020, 14-year-old William Callaghan got lost after being separated from his family while hiking. Callaghan has autism and is non-verbal. Three days later, he was found alive and well by local volunteer Ben Gibbs, after surviving freezing conditions alone in the bush. Gibbs gave Callaghan clothes and chocolate upon his discovery. Callaghan was later taken to hospital for observation, but appeared fine aside from some minor scrapes.

In August 2007, the light plane of millionaire Steve Nott crashed on Mount Disappointment where the plane's debris was found. On 31 March 2022, a chartered helicopter crashed into the mountain near Blair's Hut. Victoria Police confirmed later that day that all occupants and the pilot died in the incident.

== Flora and fauna ==
Stately mountain ash dominates the mountain and thrive in granite soils where the rainfall is high. Mountain grey gums grow in drier pockets. Red stringybarks, narrow-leafed peppermints, long-leaved box and candlebark can be found growing along some waterways.

There is an abundance of bird life and habitat for deer, wombats and wallabies.

== Mount Disappointment State Forest ==
Mount Disappointment is one of Melbourne's most accessible forest areas, with many recreation activities available including the 40 km (25 mi) long Mount Disappointment Forest Drive, various walking tracks, picnic area and camping sites. The forest is managed by the Victorian Department of Sustainability and Environment.

Roads make it possible to drive through the forest. The forest contains the remains of a World War II internment camp.

== See also ==
- List of mountains in Australia § Victoria
