= Austrophiaulax =

Austrophiaulax Temporal range: Lochkovian

Scientific classification
- Kingdom: Animalia
- Phylum: Echinodermata
- Family: †Ophiurinidae
- Genus: †Austrophiaulax; Jell, 2026
- Species: †A. kinglakensis

Binomial name
- †Austrophiaulax kinglakensis Withers & Keble, 1934

Synonyms
- Crepidosoma kinglakensis Withers & Keble, 1934

Extinct genus of ophiurinid echinoderm

Austrophiaulax is an extinct ophiurinid echinoderm from the Early Devonian of Australia. It is a monotypic genus, containing only Austrophiaulax kinglakensis.

== Discovery and naming ==
The holotype material for Austrophiaulax was found in the Devonian aged layers of Humevale Formation of Clonbinane, Australia, in 1934 and originally described as Crepidosoma kinglakensis. This remained until 2026, when it was assigned under the new genus of Austrophiaulax after more material was found from the same formation.

The generic name Austrophiaulax derives from the Latin word Austro, to mean "South"; and the genus name Ophiaulax, in reference to its Southern locality and similarities to Ophiaulax.

== Description ==
Austrophiaulax kinglakensis is a small starfish, with up to five arms that attain lengths of 35 m (114.8 ft). The disc is equally small, only getting up to between 5–8 mm (0.2–0.3 in) in diameter, and is sub-circular in its shape. The dorsal side of the plate is covered in large sub-circular plates, which are inset within a mesh of smaller irregular plates, both of which together forming a tessellated surface. The arms are notably thin, only getting up to 2–3 mm (0.1–0.1 in) in width at the base, tapering to a very fine point, and are covered fully in lateral plates. The dorsal shield plates sit in a column either-side of the perradial axis, getting smaller with the arm up to the distal end.
