= Curtobesaster =

Curtobesaster Temporal range: Lochkovian

Scientific classification
- Kingdom: Animalia
- Phylum: Echinodermata
- Class: Asteroidea
- Order: †Hadrosida
- Family: †Hudsonasteridae
- Genus: †Curtobesaster; Jell, 2026
- Species: †C. brachiatus

Binomial name
- †Curtobesaster brachiatus Jell, 2026

Extinct genus of hudsonasterid echinoderm

Curtobesaster is an extinct hudsonasterid echinoderm from the Early Devonian of Australia. It is a monotypic genus, containing only Curtobesaster brachiatus.

== Discovery and naming ==
The holotype material for Curtobesaster was found in the Devonian aged layers of Humevale Formation of Clonbinane, Australia in 2025, and was formally described and named in 2026.

The generic name Curtobesaster derives from the Latin words Curtus, to mean "short"; obesus, to mean "fat"; and the Greek suffix word -aster, to mean "star". The specific name brachiatus directly derives from the Latin word of the same spelling, brachiatus, to mean "arm". The full name is in reference to the short and fat arms of the starfish.

== Description ==
Curtobesaster brachiatus is a pentagonal-shaped starfish, with five short, fat arms. The dorsal side of the disc is notably inflated, and is covered in a mesh-work of small, convex plates. The primary radial plates are short and wide, and have slightly elongated ends. The arms themselves are composed of three columns, which are all separated, and sit in a similar mesh-like pattern of smaller sub-circular plates as seen on the disc. The larger plates decrease in size, and become more sub-quadrate towards the distal end of the arm.

Known specimens are poorly preserved, making any finer measurements difficult, but it is noted to be larger than Girvanaster.
