= Clonbinane =

- Town
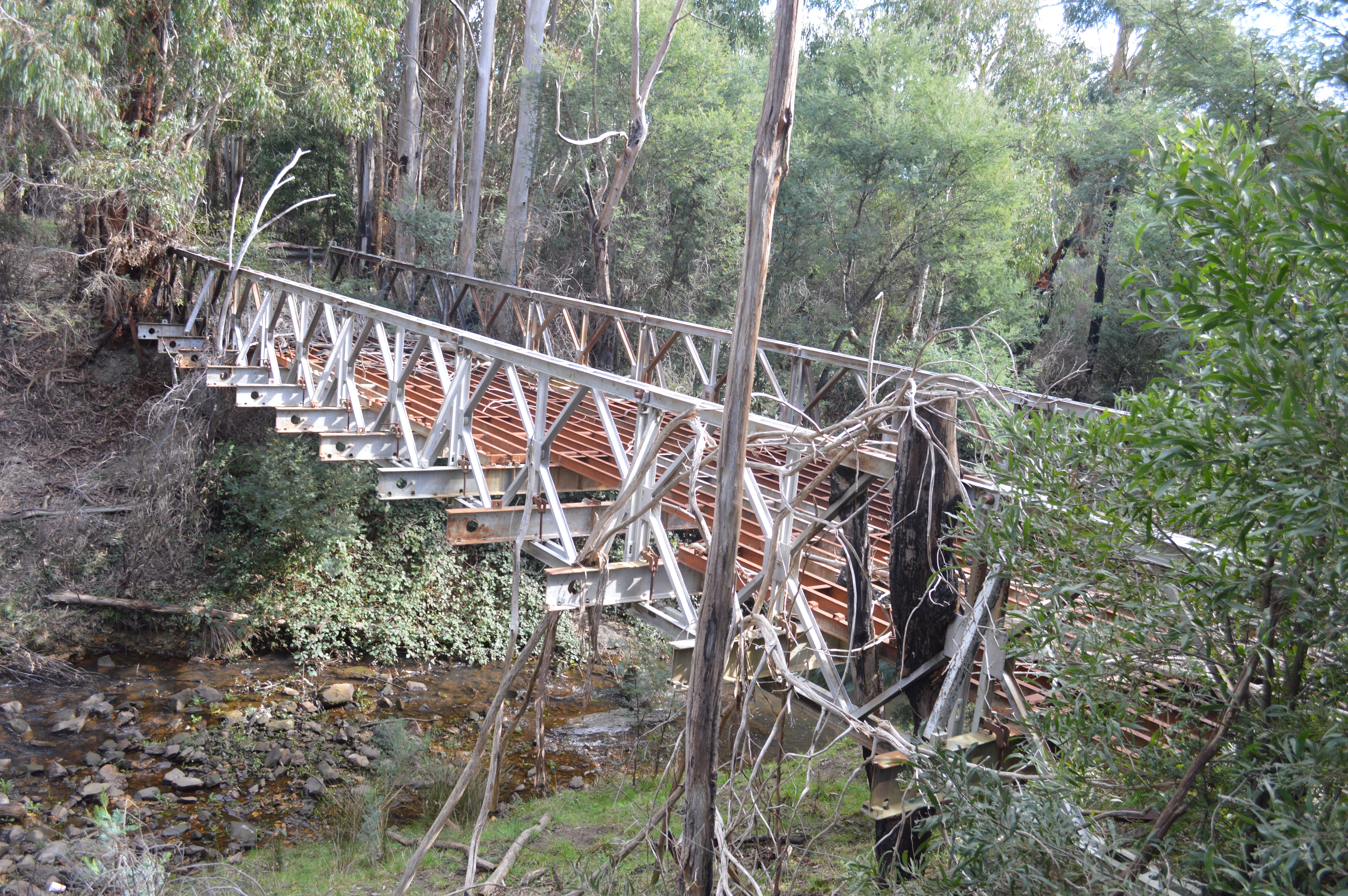
- A disused bridge over Sunday Creek on Hibberds Lane, Clonbinane

- Coordinates: 37°19′50″S 145°05′22″E
- Country: Australia
- State: Victoria
- Region: Hume
- LGA: Shire of Mitchell
- Location: 55 km (34 mi) from Melbourne

Government
  - State electorate: Euroa
  - Federal division: McEwen
- Elevation: 315 m (1,033 ft)

Population
  - Total: 347 (2021 census)
- Postcode: 3658
- Mean max temp: 25 °C (77 °F)
- Mean min temp: 15 °C (59 °F)
- Annual rainfall: 1,400 mm (55 in)
Localities around Clonbinane
Waterford Park	Waterford Park	Reedy Creek
Wandong	Clonbinane	Hazeldene
Heathcote Junction	Whittlesea	Kinglake West

Clonbinane is a locality in the Australian state of Victoria. It is located 55 kilometres (34 mi) north of the state capital city, Melbourne. Geographically, it lies east of the Hume Freeway but now lacks a distinctive township precinct. According to Crown Land records of 1856, the pastoral region was part of the Western Port District. At the 2021 census, Clonbinane had a population of 347.

The name Clonbinane suggests a marriage of two surnames, Clon and Binane. The Binane part may have found its origins in Welsh, Irish or Scottish clans surnames, deriving from the Latin "Benedictus". It is suggested that the Binane part of the name came from the galectisation of Benedictus and that the Clon part may have its origins in early Scottish history. It is not clear how the name came about as a mention in the Crown Land Leases of 1848.

== History ==
=== Colonial history ===
During the development of the Australian colonies, the Clonbinane area was part of the Colony of New South Wales between 1788 and 1851 when, on 1 July 1851, Victoria was separated from New South Wales. An early mention of the name Clonbinane appeared in The Argus on 29 September 1848 in relation to Claims to Leases of Crown Land. At that time, a 10,400-hectare (25,600-acre)–run Clonbinane was cited as a claim by Michael Heffernan. The property was bound by 8 kilometres (5 mi) along Reedy Creek to the north, Mt Whitehead 2.4 kilometres (1.5 mi) to the west, up to the ranges east and 4.8 kilometres (3 mi) off Kirk and Harlin to the south with a potential for 600 head of cattle.

=== Gold mining ===
Historic gold mining between 1880 and 1920 occurred over a greater than 11 km trend where total production is reported as 41,000 oz gold at a grade of 33 g/t gold. Drilling during the 1990-2000s focused on shallow, previously mined surface workings, covering an area of 100 m in width, 800 m length but only to 80 m depth. There was a cyanide processing plant on the Wandong-Kilmore Rd which served the local gold mines. When the gold appeared to run out, the area was extensively logged and supported saw milling.

In February 2022, gold exploration company Southern Cross Gold signed a contract to acquire 300 acres of freehold land at the Sunday Creek Project, and work remains ongoing. Mineralisation at the Sunday Creek Project is hosted in late-Silurian to early-Devonian-aged shales and siltstones containing a series of dykes of felsic-intermediate composition. Gold is concentrated mainly in and around the EW to NE-SW trending felsic dykes, within predominately NW oriented brittle multiple sheeted veins and cataclastic zones. Individual high-grade quartz-stibnite veins at Apollo and Golden Dyke, and cataclastic zones at Gladys were the focus of historical mining at Sunday Creek. The project also contains the significant critical metal potential by product of antimony. Sunday Creek is considered to be one of the best new high grade and large exploration discoveries to come out of Australia in recent times.

=== Postal services ===
Clonbinane Post Office opened on 23 January 1892 and closed on 1 July 1895, reopening again 5 October 1897 and closing 30 April 1956. According to National Archives of Australia, it was determined in 1964 that, at the time of its existence in 1902, the Clonbinane Post Office was domiciled at the Clonbinane Park homestead. The prominence of that site suggests that was the true location of Clonbinane, which concurs with government mapping. According to the Victorian Postal Guide of March 1895, mail coming from Melbourne had to be posted by 0530 hours to reach Clonbinane Post Office by 1330 hours on the same day, allowing for sorting and logistics. At Clonbinane, mail had to lodged by 0900 hours to reach Melbourne's GPO by 1525 hours. Those time-frames suggest that mail was routinely carried by train during the period, probably between Melbourne and Wandong. The Clonbinane post office building burnt down in the Black Saturday fires on 7 February 2009. It was a single room weatherboard shed with a corrugated iron roof and was on the property known as Walhaven on Government Road which, along with the original Clonbinane Park homestead, was destroyed in the fires.

== Location ==
The small village called Clonbinane (next to and named after the homestead) is located on the banks of Sunday Creek, just off Clonbinane Road, and is accessed via Hibberds Lane over a bridge across the creek. In its gold mining heyday, the village had about 20 houses and a school. Clonbinane shares a postcode with neighbouring towns Broadford, Flowerdale, Hazeldene, Reedy Creek, Strath Creek, Sugarloaf Creek, Sunday Creek, Tyaak and Waterford Park. An adjacent housing estate called Waterford Park is often mistaken for Clonbinane itself. In 2006, the total population of this postcode was 5047.

=== 2000s ===
In July 2007, a Rockwell Commander 500S aircraft, en route to Shepparton from Essendon Airport, broke up in-flight approximately 1.5 km SSW of the Equine Centre (at 37°21.65′S 145°05.55′E), crashing in a heavily timbered mountain range. The aircraft was carrying the aircraft's owner and a pilot on an aircraft recovery mission when it encountered severe turbulence; both sustained fatal injuries.

The region was affected by the Black Saturday bushfires on 7 February 2009 with the fires converging from Kilmore East over the area's farmlets.

== Places of interest ==
The area is host to the Equi Ventures Equestrian Centre, located at 37°20.843′S 145°06.250′E just before the entrance to the Anderson's Gardens bush park on the Clonbinane Road at the entrance to the Mt Disappointment National Park. As of 1 August 2011, the bush parks are still inaccessible or difficult to access due to forest safety concerns after the fires.

=== Clonbinane Park ===
"Clonbinane Park" is a heritage listed site built for M. K. McKenzie around 1885 located approximately 250 metres (820 ft) off the Clonbinane Road (at 37°19′42.65″S 145°05′27.05″E). Crown land licence records from 1856 suggested two large pastoral properties (runs) of around 10,400 hectares (25,600 acres) were operated by the McKenzie and McDonald families at Clonbinane and Reedy Creek. According to The Argus of 27 January 1866 John McRae McKenzie was reported as being of Clonbinane and Tallarook Stations when on 25 January 1866 he married Emily Anne Cairnes, eldest daughter of Henry Cairnes of Dublin, Ireland. John McDonald was reported in the records to have been assessed for 4,600 sheep, 20 cattle and 8 horses. "Clonbinane Park" was in 1922 a property of 779 hectares (1,924 acres) with a 490-hectare (1,210-acre) grating area with excellent potential for cattle grazing and wool production. "Clonbinane Station" appears to have been a much larger property with a sales notice in The Argus of 4 July 1878 citing 32,000 hectares (80,000 acres). The old homestead at Clonbinane Park was almost completely destroyed by the Black Saturday bushfires in 2009. The shell of the building and its tower were finally demolished in May 2021.

== Weather ==
Rainfall typically results in balanced wet and dry days per annum. Highest rainfall rates occur in February and late October through November. The average per day is around 2.9 millimetres (0.11 in) and the high range is 55 to 70 millimetres (2.2 to 2.8 in). Total rainfall per annum is around 1,000 to 1,400 millimetres (39 to 55 in).

Temperatures typically peak in February and are at their lowest in June–July which can result in morning frost. The daily spread is about 10 °C (50 °F) degrees. On Black Saturday, temperatures in and around Melbourne reached near 47 °C (117 °F).
