= Eckardtaster =

Eckardtaster Temporal range: Lochkovian

Scientific classification
- Kingdom: Animalia
- Phylum: Echinodermata
- Class: Ophiuroidea
- Family: incertae sedis
- Genus: †Eckardtaster; Jell, 2026
- Species: †E. superbus

Binomial name
- †Eckardtaster superbus Jell, 2026

Extinct genus of echinoderm

Eckardtaster is an extinct starfish echinoderm from the Early Devonian of Australia. It is a monotypic genus, containing only Eckardtaster superbus.

== Discovery and naming ==
The holotype material for Eckardtaster was found in the Devonian aged layers of Humevale Formation of Clonbinane, Australia in 2025, and was formally described and named in 2026.

The generic name Eckardtaster is in honour of Egon "Steve" Eckardt, a well known fossil hunter that excavated a majority of the echinoderm fossils from the type locality that also contained Eckardtaster. The specific name superbus directly derives from the Latin word of the same spelling, superbus, to mean "above", in reference to the Egon "Steve" Eckardt, who is noted as a superb fossil hunter.

== Description ==
Eckardtaster superbus is a small starfish, with five short arms up to 30 mm (1.2 in) in length. The disc, which is sub-circular in shape, reaches up to 20 mm (0.8 in) in diameter, with its dorsal surface bearing a covering of fine, granular plates, which are notably not arranged in any pattern expect for possibly at the margin of the disc itself, with larger elongate plates appearing to form a marginal circlet. Although, the circlet is also noted to never be complete in any known specimen, and is not as clear as members of the family Ophiurinidae.

The fine granular plates continue onto the arms themselves, although not all the way and only covering the vertebrae. In one specimen, the vertebrae do not feature this plate covering, allowing researchers a look below, showing that the vertebrae feature a notable pair of low flanges which slightly increase the surface area for muscle attachment, specially in the clefts between each vertebra. The clefts themselves are noted to pinch outwards, which has been inferred to permit both vertebrae columns to work in tandem to either keep the arm straight or to turn it. The mouth frame was also revealed in this specimen, which is composed of five jaws supported by modified ambulacrals. The area around the mouth also features small plates, although it has been noted these could be displaced from other areas of the organism.
