= Pyalong =

- Town
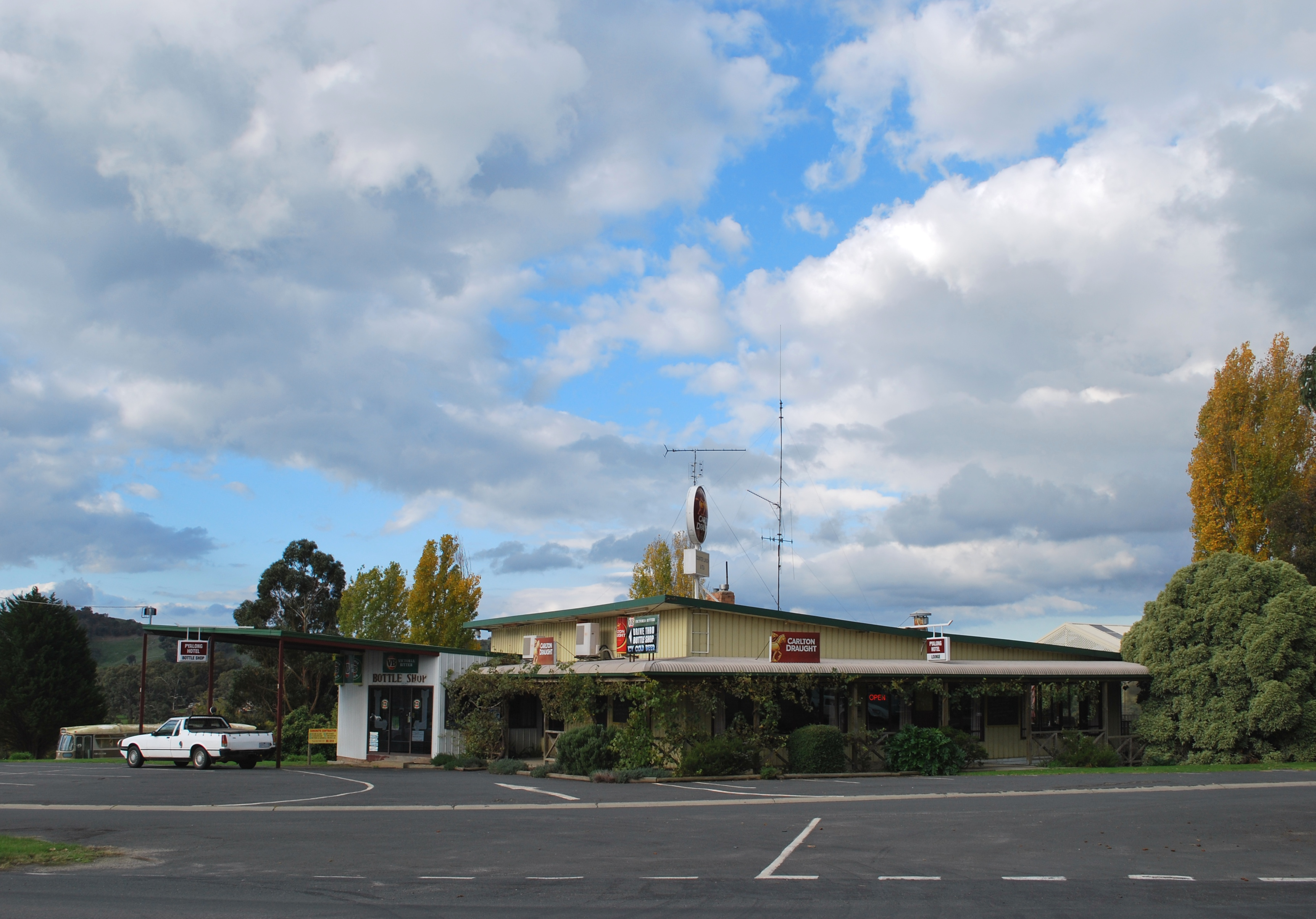
- Pyalong Hotel

- Interactive map of Pyalong
- Coordinates: 37°07′0″S 144°51′0″E
- Country: Australia
- State: Victoria
- Region: Hume
- LGA: Shire of Mitchell
- Location: 90 km (56 mi) N of Melbourne; 73 km (45 mi) SE of Bendigo; 24 km (15 mi) N of Kilmore

Government
  - State electorate: Euroa
  - Federal division: Bendigo

Population
  - Total: 772 (2021 census)
- Postcode: 3521
Localities around Pyalong
Tooborac	Tooborac	Glenaroua
Benloch	Pyalong	Glenaroua
Lancefield	Willowmavin	Glenaroua

Pyalong /ˈpaɪ.əlɒŋ/ is a town in central Victoria, Australia. The town is located on the Northern Highway, in the Shire of Mitchell local government area, 90 kilometres (56 mi) from the state capital, Melbourne. At the 2021 census, Pyalong had a population of 772.

The traditional owners of Pyalong are the Taungurung people, a part of the Kulin nation that inhabited a large portion of central Victoria including Port Phillip Bay and its surrounds.

The first Europeans to settle in the area were Captain George Brunswick Smyth and Lieutenant Alfred Miller Mundy who were operating the Pyalong station by August 1838, and William Hamilton who occupied the adjacent Glenaroua run at the same time. They were followed by Alexander Mollison who initially took up the Coliban station in December 1838 then added the Pyalong station lease in 1839. The town itself was surveyed and proclaimed in 1854, and was sufficiently populated for the Post Office to open on 1 November 1858.

Pyalong was connected by rail in 1890 with a station on the Heathcote railway line. The line was closed in 1968. It retains a daily V/Line coach service to Kilmore, Wallan and Melbourne.

Until 1994 the town was the seat of the Shire of Pyalong, then Victoria's smallest municipality by population.

Golfers play at the course of the Pyalong Golf Club on the Northern Highway.
