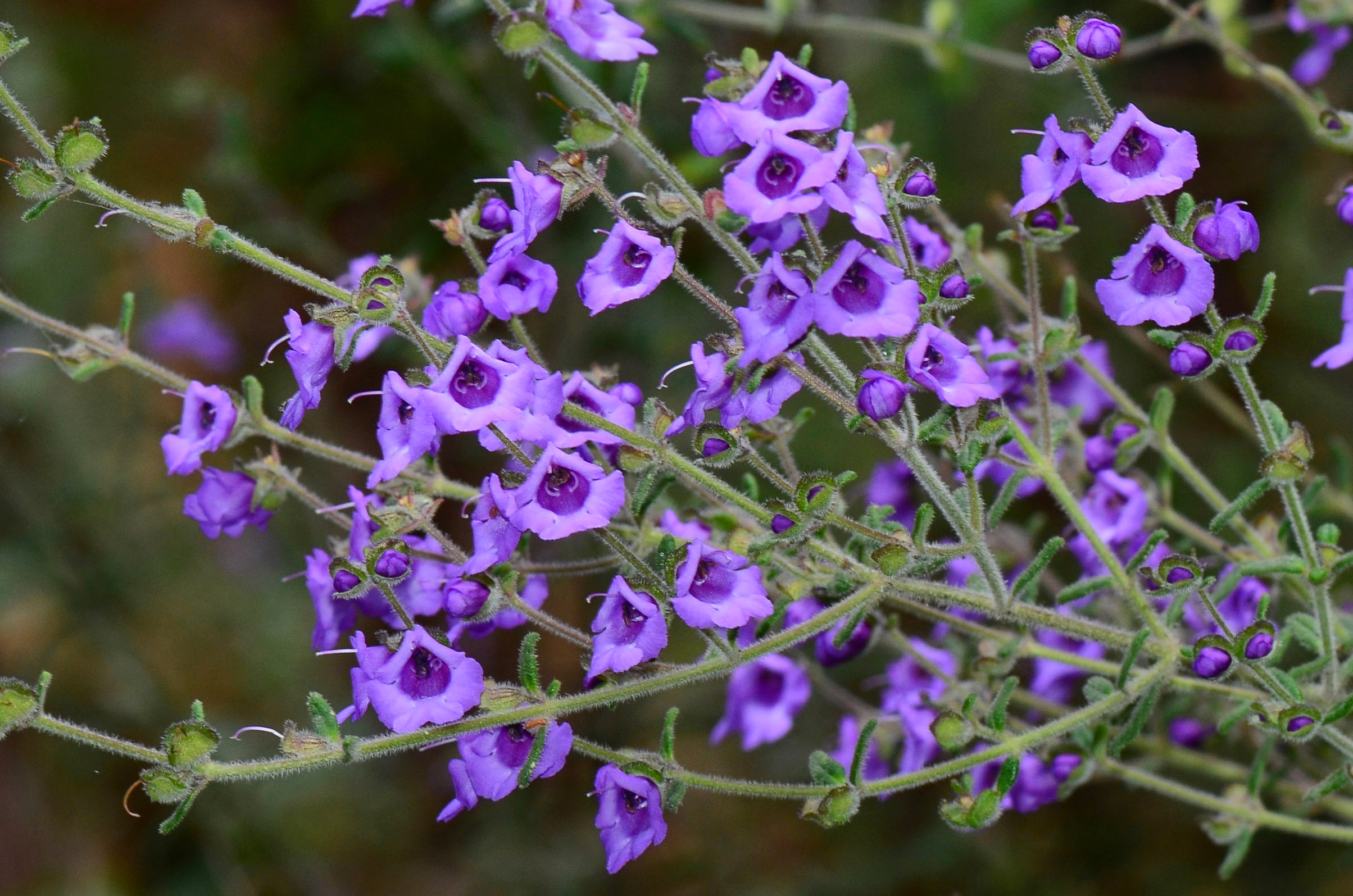
- In Grampians National Park

Scientific classification
- Kingdom: Plantae
- Clade: Tracheophytes
- Clade: Angiosperms
- Clade: Eudicots
- Clade: Asterids
- Order: Lamiales
- Family: Lamiaceae
- Genus: Prostanthera
- Species: P. hirtula

Binomial name
- Prostanthera hirtula F.Muell. ex Benth.
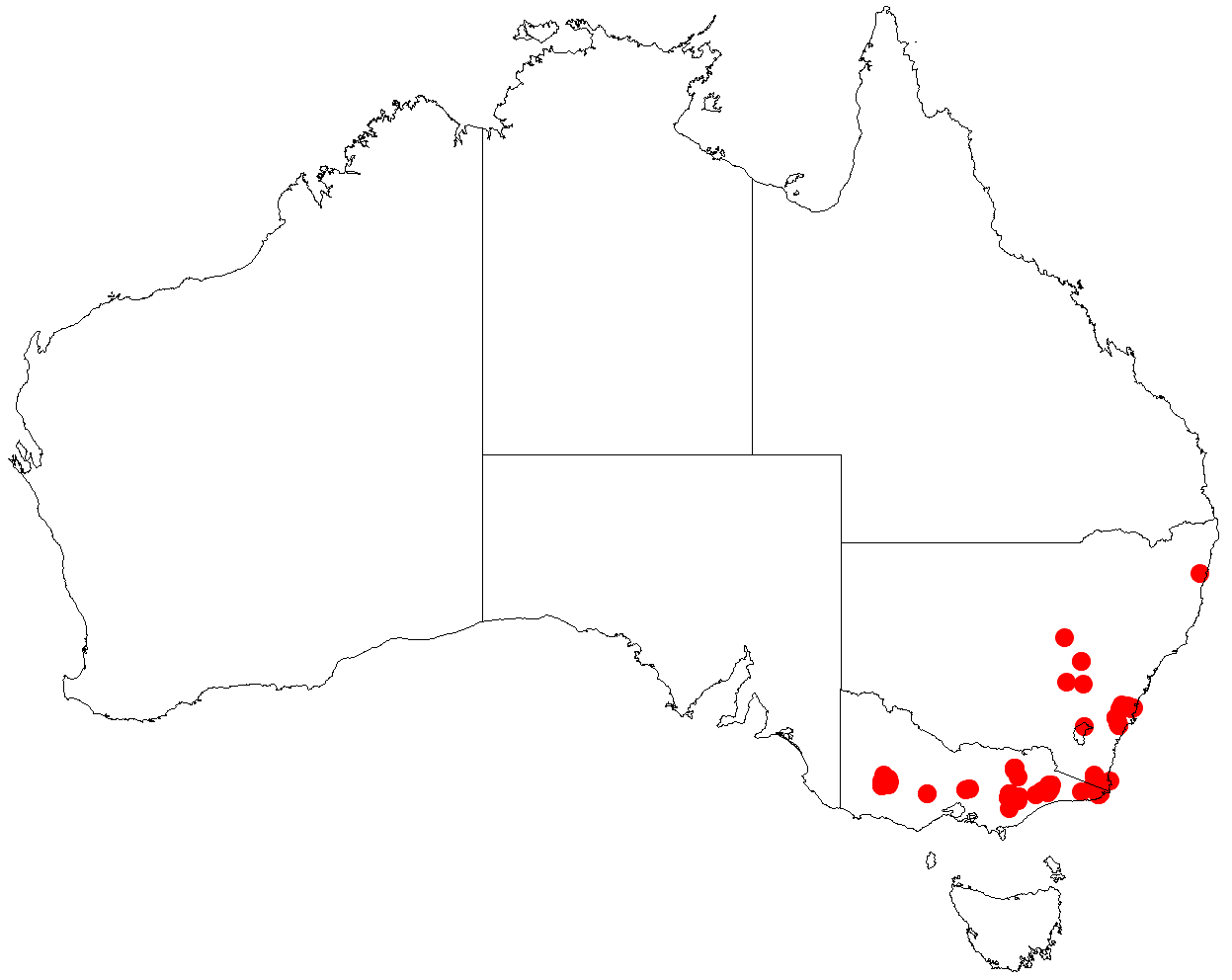
- Occurrence data from AVH

Synonyms
- Prostanthera hirtula F.Muell. nom. inval., nom. nud.; Prostanthera hirtula var. angustifolia Benth.; Prostanthera hirtula var. hirtula F.Muell. ex Benth.

= Prostanthera hirtula =

Hairy mintbush

Species of flowering plant

Prostanthera hirtula, commonly known as hairy mintbush, is a species of flowering plant in the family Lamiaceae and is endemic to the south-eastern continental Australia. It is a strongly aromatic, densely hairy, spreading shrub with narrow egg-shaped leaves and dark mauve flowers, and that grows in exposed, rocky sites.

== Description ==
Prostanthera hirtula is a strongly aromatic, densely hairy, spreading shrub that grows to a height of 0.4–2 m (1 ft 4 in – 6 ft 7 in) and is covered in more or less spreading hairs. The leaves are mid-green, narrow egg-shaped to narrow elliptic, densely glandular on the lower surface, 10–30 mm (0.39–1.18 in) long and 1.5–6 mm (0.059–0.236 in) wide on a petiole 0.5–2 mm (0.020–0.079 in) long. The flowers are borne in leaf axils near the ends of branchlets with bracteoles about 2 mm (0.079 in) long at the base. The sepals are 5–7 mm (0.20–0.28 in) long, forming a tube about 3 mm (0.12 in) long with two lobes, the upper lobe 2–4 mm (0.079–0.157 in) long. The petals are dark mauve and 8–10 mm (0.31–0.39 in) long. Flowering occurs in spring.

== Taxonomy and naming ==
Prostanthera hirtula was first formally described in 1870 by George Bentham from an unpublished description by Ferdinand von Mueller, based on specimens collected at Mount Buffalo and Mount Disappointment by Mueller and in the Grampians by Carl Wilhelmi. Bentham's description was published in Flora Australiensis.

== Distribution and habitat ==
Hairy mintbush grows on elevated, rocky sites in woodland and open forest in New South Wales from the Blue Mountains to the Budawang Range and in southern Victoria.
