= Flowerdale, Victoria =

Flowerdale
- Town
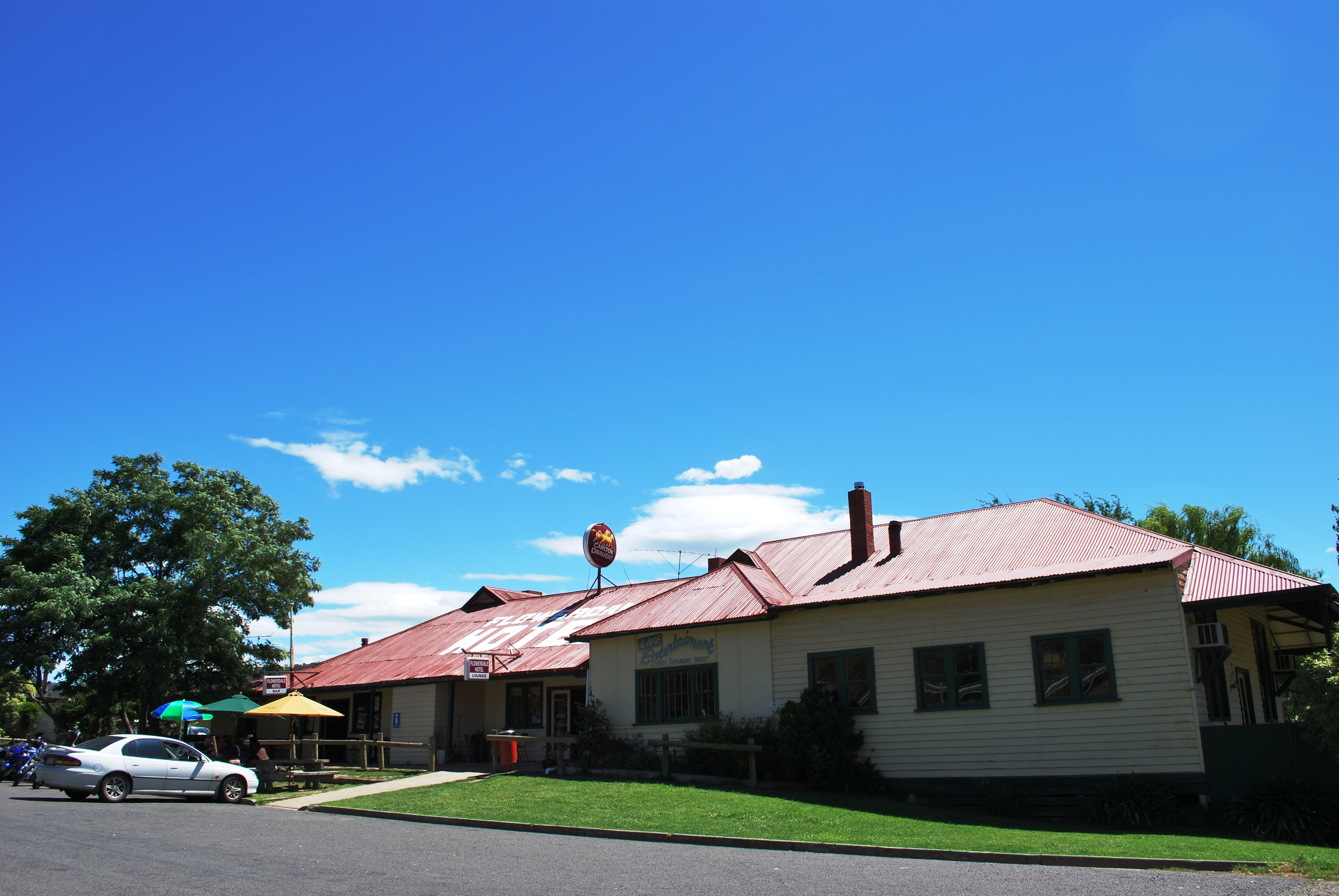
- Flowerdale Hotel

- Coordinates: 37°20′41″S 145°17′12″E
- Country: Australia
- State: Victoria
- Region: Hume
- LGAs: Shire of Murrindindi; Shire of Mitchell
- Location: 95 km (59 mi) N of Melbourne; 42 km (26 mi) SW of Yea; 31 km (19 mi) SE of Broadford

Government
  - State electorate: Eildon
  - Federal division: Indi

Population
  - Total: 790 (2021 census)
- Postcode: 3717
Localities around Flowerdale
Strath Creek	Strath Creek	Strath Creek
Clonbinane	Flowerdale	Hazeldene
Kinglake West	Kinglake	Glenburn

Flowerdale is a town in Victoria, Australia. It is in the Shire of Murrindindi local government area, 95 kilometres (59 mi) from the state capital, Melbourne. It is in the foothills of the Great Dividing Range, in the upper catchment of the Goulburn River system. At the 2021 Census, Flowerdale had a population of 790.

Flowerdale Post Office opened on 4 February 1881 and closed in 1974. Subsequently reopened at Hazeldene General Store and has operated there from around 2000 ongoing though April 2025

The area was devastated by the Black Saturday bushfires in February 2009, with the loss of many houses. However, the school, hotel and community hall were spared.

== Hazeldene ==
On 9 April 2014. Flowerdale officially absorbed the adjacent locality of Hazeldene, following a decision by the state government to merge the two places. The council, which had supported the move, cited a community desire for a "unified sense of community identity" following the Black Saturday bushfires, which had caused significant damage in both places.

Hazeldene had a population of 535 at the 2006 census. Over 200 houses had been destroyed and over 10 deaths were recorded in Hazeldene area during the bushfire. The General Store and Post Office were spared, but the Jarara Community Centre was destroyed. In its 2009–2010 Budget, Murrindindi Shire Council indicated that the Jarara Community Centre would be rebuilt but, due to the high fire danger associated with its previous site in Silver Creek Road, Council would rebuild it elsewhere within the Hazeldene/Flowerdale area. A new Flowerdale Community House was built and opened around 2015 on the Jarara site.

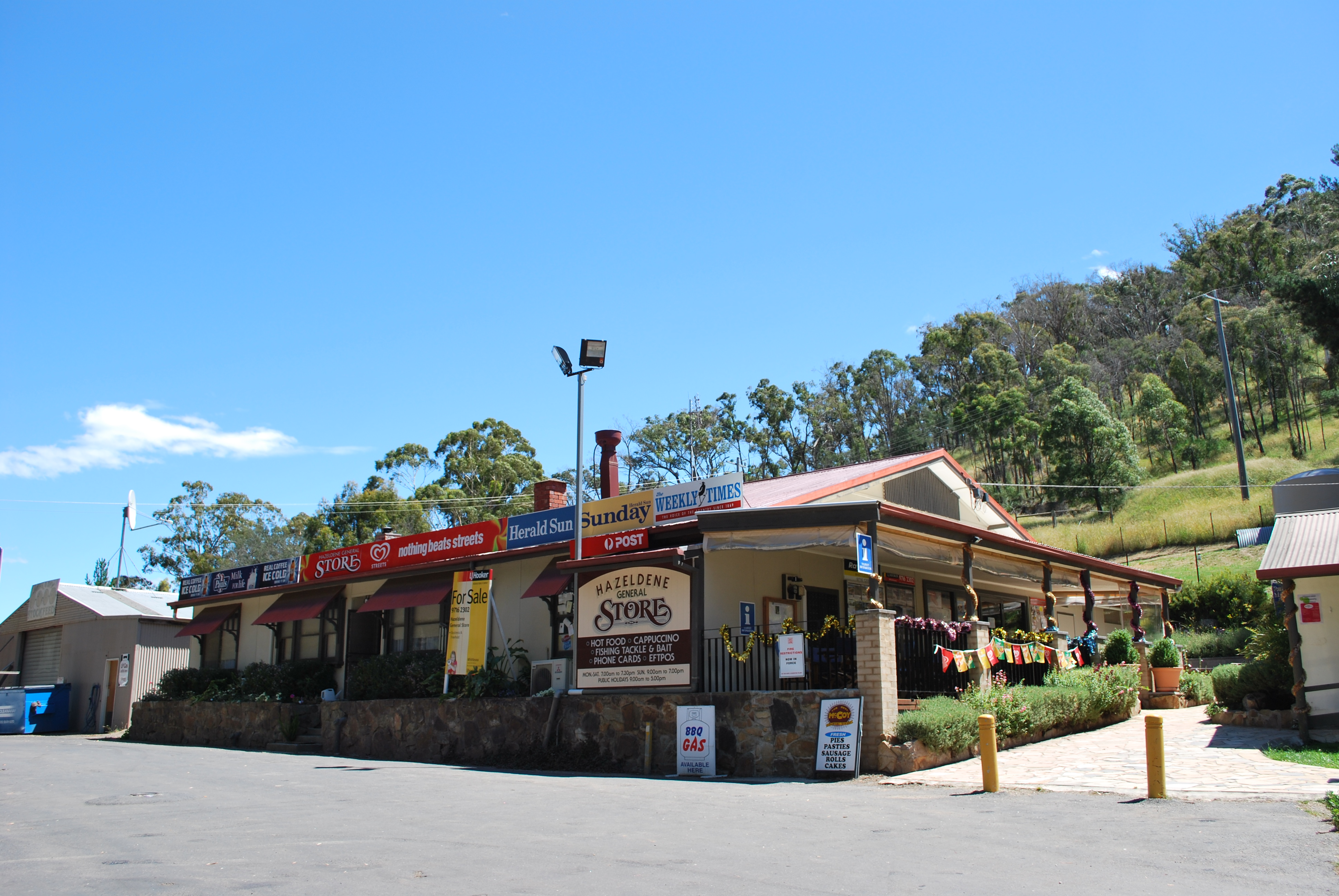
Hazeldene General Store

== Sport ==
Golf was played at the course of the Valley View Golf Coaching Centre on Spring Valley Road, Flowerdale, but the facility closed in about 2012. Tennis and cricket are played at the Spring Valley Recreation Reserve.
