= Emu Flat =

Emu Flat is the name of several places in Australia:

- Emu Flat, South Australia in the Clare Valley
- Emu Flat, Victoria southeast of Bendigo
- Emu Flat, Western Australia east of Kalgoorlie in the City of Kalgoorlie-Boulder
