= Moranding =

- Town
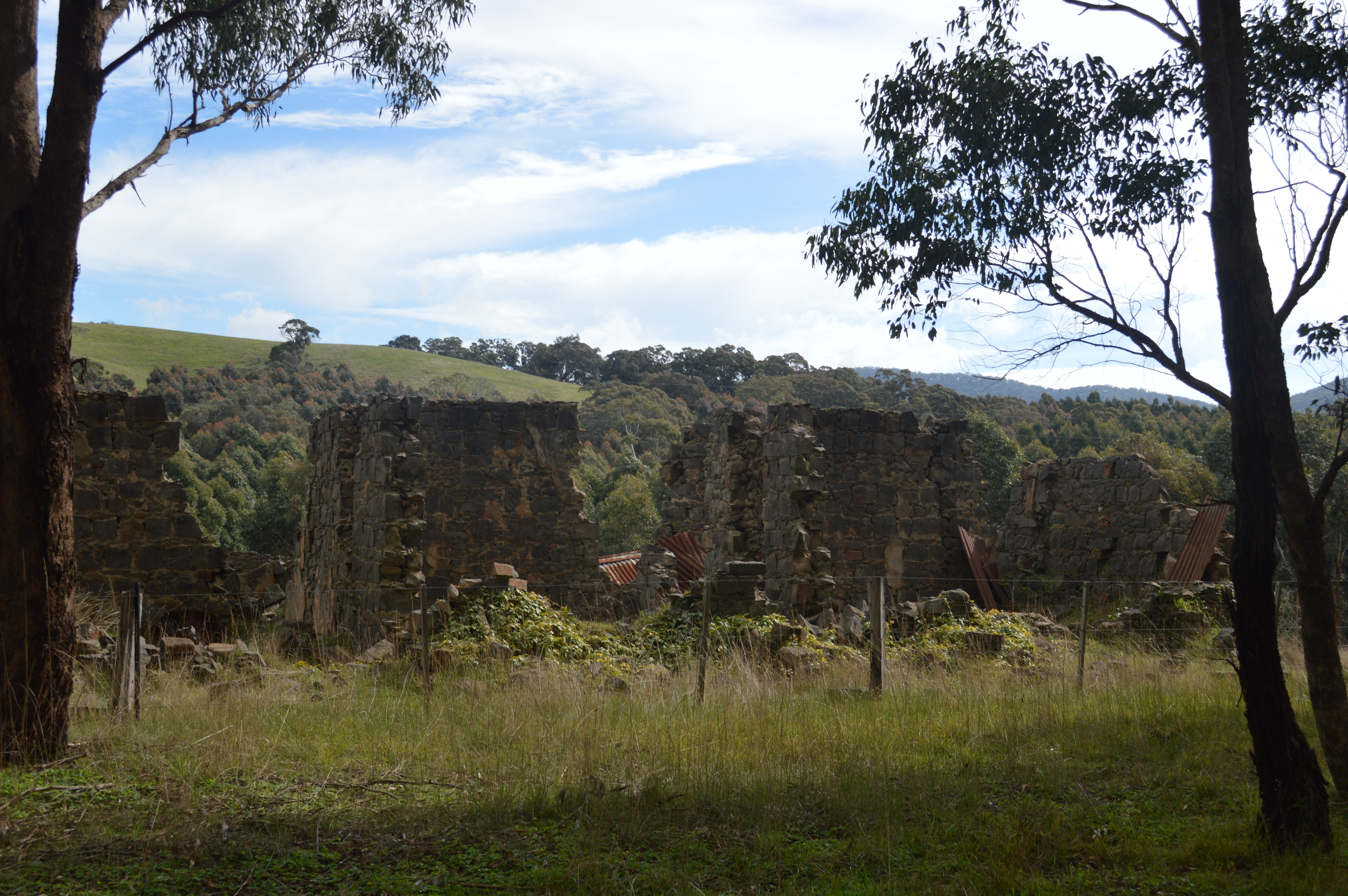
- The ruins of the former Harvest Home Hotel at Moranding

- Coordinates: 37°14′10″S 144°53′11″E
- Country: Australia
- State: Victoria
- Region: Hume
- LGA: Shire of Mitchell
- Location: 86 km (53 mi) N of Melbourne; 12 km (7.5 mi) NW of Kilmore

Government
  - State electorate: Euroa
  - Federal division: Nicholls

Population
  - Total: 193 (SAL 2021)
- Postcode: 3764

Moranding /məˈrændɪŋ/ is a locality in central Victoria, Australia. It is in the Shire of Mitchell local government area, 86 kilometres (53 mi) north of the state capital, Melbourne.

At the 2016 census, Moranding had a population of 185.
