= Tyaak =

- Town
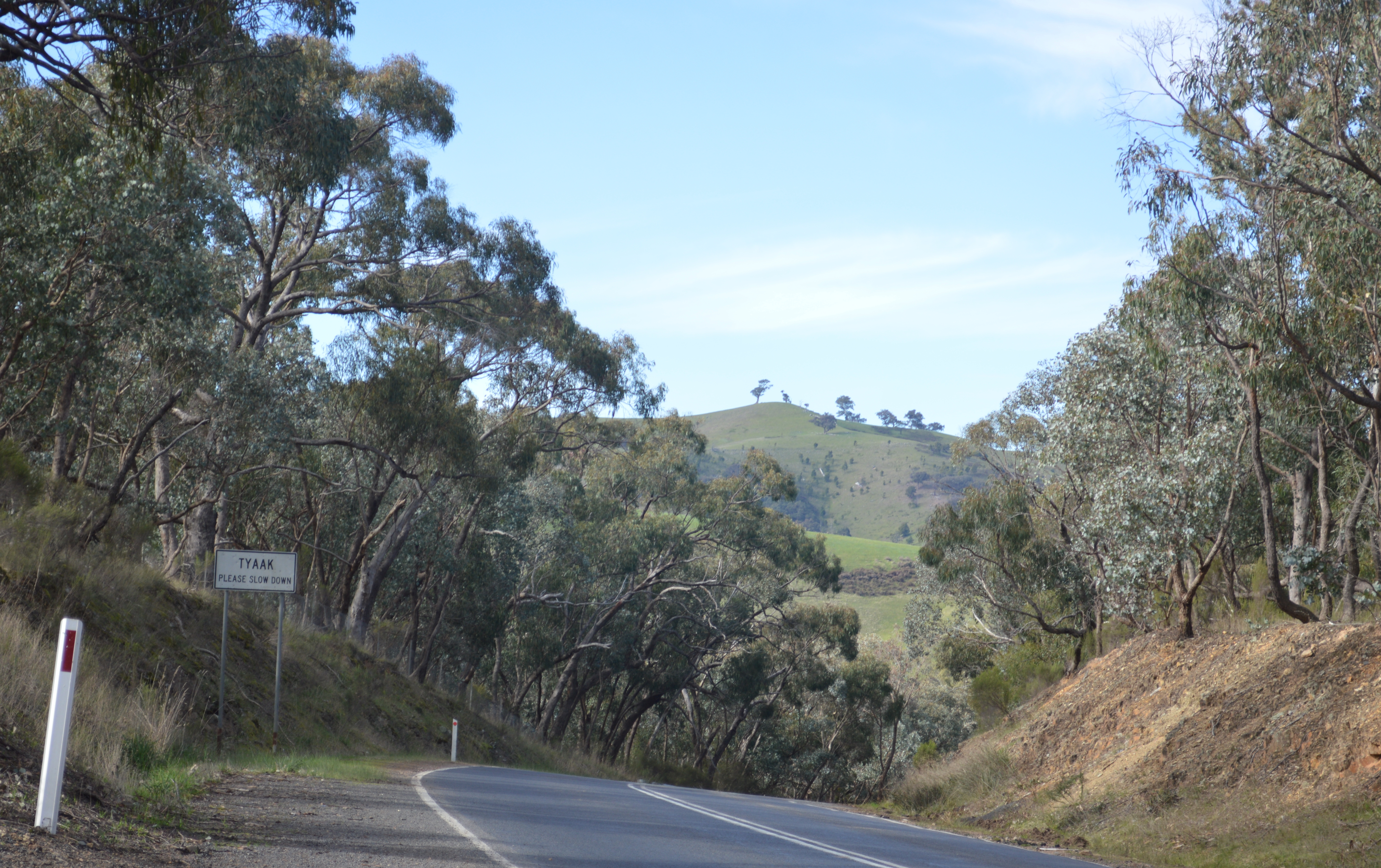
- Strath Creek Road passing through Tyaak, 2017

- Coordinates: 37°13′18″S 145°08′17″E
- Country: Australia
- State: Victoria
- Region: Hume
- LGA: Shire of Mitchell
- Location: 94 km (58 mi) N of Melbourne; 8 km (5.0 mi) E of Broadford

Government
  - State electorate: Euroa
  - Federal division: Nicholls

Population
  - Total: 73 (2016 census)
- Postcode: 3658

Tyaak is a locality in central Victoria, Australia. The locality is in the Shire of Mitchell local government area, 99 kilometres (62 mi) north of the state capital, Melbourne.

At the 2016 census, Tyaak had a population of 73.
