= Old Kilmore Gaol =

Heritage listed building in Kilmore, Australia

- Location within Victoria
- 37°17′48″S 144°56′58″E
- Location: 8-12 Sutherland Street, Kilmore, Australia

History
- Built: 1857

Site notes
- Architectural style: Australian Colonial

The Old Kilmore Gaol is a bluestone building in Kilmore, Victoria. It was originally built as a gaol and is located at 8 to 12 Sutherland Street.

== History ==
Old Kilmore Gaol was built in 1857 under the supervision of Charles Pasley. It was a gaol from 1859 until 1891 when it was decommissioned and used as a butter factory. In the 1960s it became a private home and was a restaurant in the 1990s before reverting again to a private home in 2004. Today, the gaol is used for commercial purposes. Its bluestone walls and exterior appearance are the only original features that have been retained.

== Heritage significance ==
It appears on the Heritage Council of Victoria's Victorian Heritage Database, for being "one of a small group of early Victorian prisons to be built outside of Melbourne." and "for its long use as a centre of dairy production and distribution ... and for its contribution to Kilmore's rare group of Basalt public buildings." and is listed on the Register of the National Estate.
