= Alice Heron Maxwell =

New Zealand custodian

Alice Heron Maxwell (9 October 1860–24 July 1949) was a New Zealand custodian. She was born in Kilmore, Victoria, Australia on 9 October 1860.
