= Waterford Park, Victoria =

Waterford Park
- Town
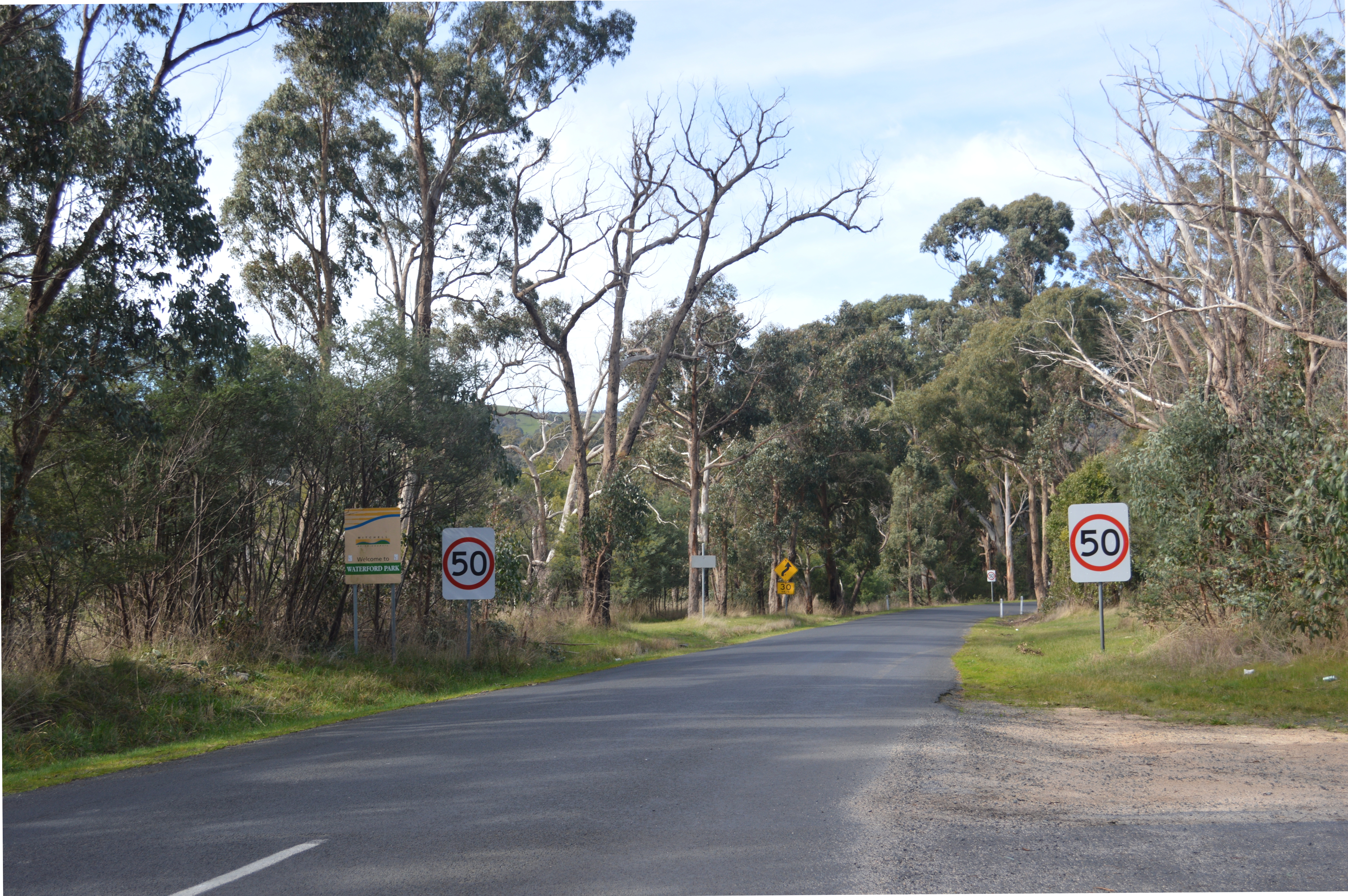
- Entering Waterford Park, 2017

- Coordinates: 37°15′48″S 145°07′52″E
- Country: Australia
- State: Victoria
- Region: Hume
- LGA: Shire of Mitchell
- Location: 62 km (39 mi) N of Melbourne; 13 km (8.1 mi) S of Broadford

Government
  - State electorate: Euroa
  - Federal division: McEwen

Population
  - Total: 193 (2016 census)
- Postcode: 3658

Waterford Park is a locality in central Victoria, Australia. The locality is in the Shire of Mitchell local government area, 62 kilometres (39 mi) north of the state capital, Melbourne.

At the 2016 census, Waterford Park had a population of 193.
