= Glenaroua =

- Town
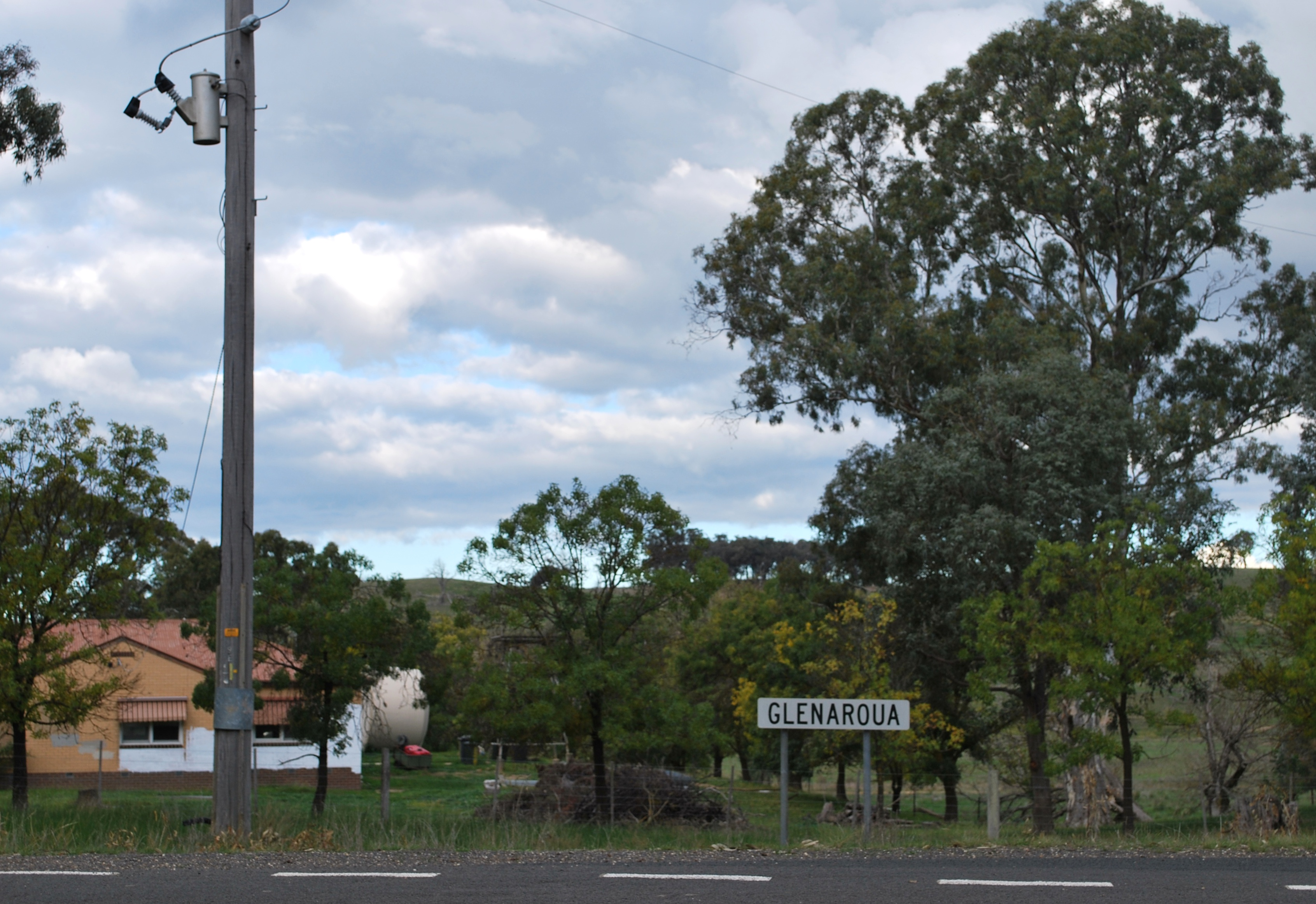
- Glenaroua, 2010

- Coordinates: 37°06′37″S 144°57′40″E
- Country: Australia
- State: Victoria
- Region: Hume
- LGA: Shire of Mitchell
- Location: 93 km (58 mi) NW of Melbourne; 17 km (11 mi) NW of Broadford; 12 km (7.5 mi) E of Pyalong

Government
  - State electorate: Euroa
  - Federal division: Nicholls

Population
  - Total: 154 (2016 census)
- Postcode: 3764

Glenaroua is a locality in central Victoria, Australia. The locality is in the Shire of Mitchell local government area, 93 kilometres (58 mi) north west of the state capital, Melbourne.

At the 2016 census, Glenaroua had a population of 154.
