= Heathcote South =

- Town
- Coordinates: 37°1′51″S 144°43′34″E
- Country: Australia
- State: Victoria
- Region: Hume
- LGA: Shire of Mitchell
- Location: 131.6 km (81.8 mi) NW of Melbourne

Government
  - State electorate: Euroa
  - Federal division: Nicholls

Population
  - Total: 14 (2016 census)
- Postcode: 3523

Heathcote South is a locality in central Victoria, Australia. The locality is in the Shire of Mitchell local government area, 117 kilometres (73 mi) north west of the state capital, Melbourne.

At the 2016 census, Heathcote South had a population of 14.
