= Sunday River =

Sunday River may refer to:

- Sunday River (Osgood River tributary), Chaudière-Appalaches, Quebec, Canada
- Sunday River (Androscoggin River tributary), Oxford County, Maine, United States
- Sunday River (ski resort), one of Maine's largest ski resorts located near the confluence of the Sunday and Androscoggin rivers

== See also ==
- Sundays River, Eastern Cape Province, South Africa
- Sunday Creek (disambiguation)
