= Kilmore International School =

The Kilmore International School

Location
- 40 White Street; Kilmore, Victoria, Australia; Kilmore, Victoria, 3764; Australia; 37°18′10″S 144°57′9″E

Information
- Type: Private
- Motto: Excellentia Academica Persequenda (The Pursuit of Academic Excellence)
- Established: 1990
- Founder: Ray Wittmer
- Status: Closed
- Closed: July 2022
- Grades: 3–12
- Website: www.kilmore.vic.edu.au

The Kilmore International School (TKIS), located in Kilmore, Victoria, Australia, was a non-denominational international school established in 1990 offering Years 3–12, and boarding from Year 7. The school was a not-for profit enterprise listed on the Australian Charities and Not-for-profit (ACNC) register. It officially changed its name to Colmont School on 1 July 2022, then on 28 July announced it had been placed into administration and would close at the end of that week.

== History ==
It was established in 1990 in the former Assumption College buildings, which were built in 1887 by the Marist Brothers of the Catholic Church. The site was purchased in the 1980s and renovated. The school opened in 1990 with two international students. In 2011, a Language Learning Centre was opened which now operates as the IB Centre. The school grounds contain a football oval, a soccer field, basketball courts and tennis courts.

The school was a secondary school until 2009, when Years 5 and 6 were added. Years 3 and 4 were added as well, in 2015.

On 1 July 2022, the school officially changed its name to Colmont School.

On 28 July 2022, Colmont School announced it had been placed into administration and would close at the end of that week.

== Campus and facilities ==
The main campus was in Kilmore, Victoria, located approximately 1.5 km from the town centre, at 40 White Street.

Classes offered were from Years 3–12, with boarding available from Year 7.

Scholarships for tuition were available once a year for new and existing students.

== International Baccalaureate curriculum ==
In Year 11 and 12, students partook in the International Baccalaureate Diploma Program (IBDP).

The IBDP is internationally recognised and depending on a score out of 45 split between 6 subjects worth 7 marks each and 3 marks from a philosophical study known as "Theory of Knowledge" or better known as "TOK" and a 4000 word research project known as the "Extended Essay". Assuming a student achieves the highest possible IB score, 45, the student is eligible for direct enrolment into prestigious universities throughout the world.

== English and other languages ==
All courses were taught in English with ESL (English as a Second Language) support in conjunction with normal academic subjects.

== See also ==
- List of schools in Victoria
- List of boarding schools
