= Sunday Creek, Victoria =

Sunday Creek
- Town
- Coordinates: 37°15′1.8288″S 145°02′58.6356″E
- Country: Australia
- State: Victoria
- Region: Hume
- LGA: Shire of Mitchell
- Location: 82 km (51 mi) N of Melbourne; 6.6 km (4.1 mi) S of Broadford

Government
  - State electorate: Euroa
  - Federal division: Nicholls

Population
  - Total: 368 (2021 census)
- Postcode: 3658

Sunday Creek is a locality in central Victoria, Australia. The locality is in the Shire of Mitchell local government area, 82 kilometers (51 mi) north of the state capital, Melbourne.

At the 2021 census, Sunday Creek had a population of 368.
