= Willowmavin =

- Town
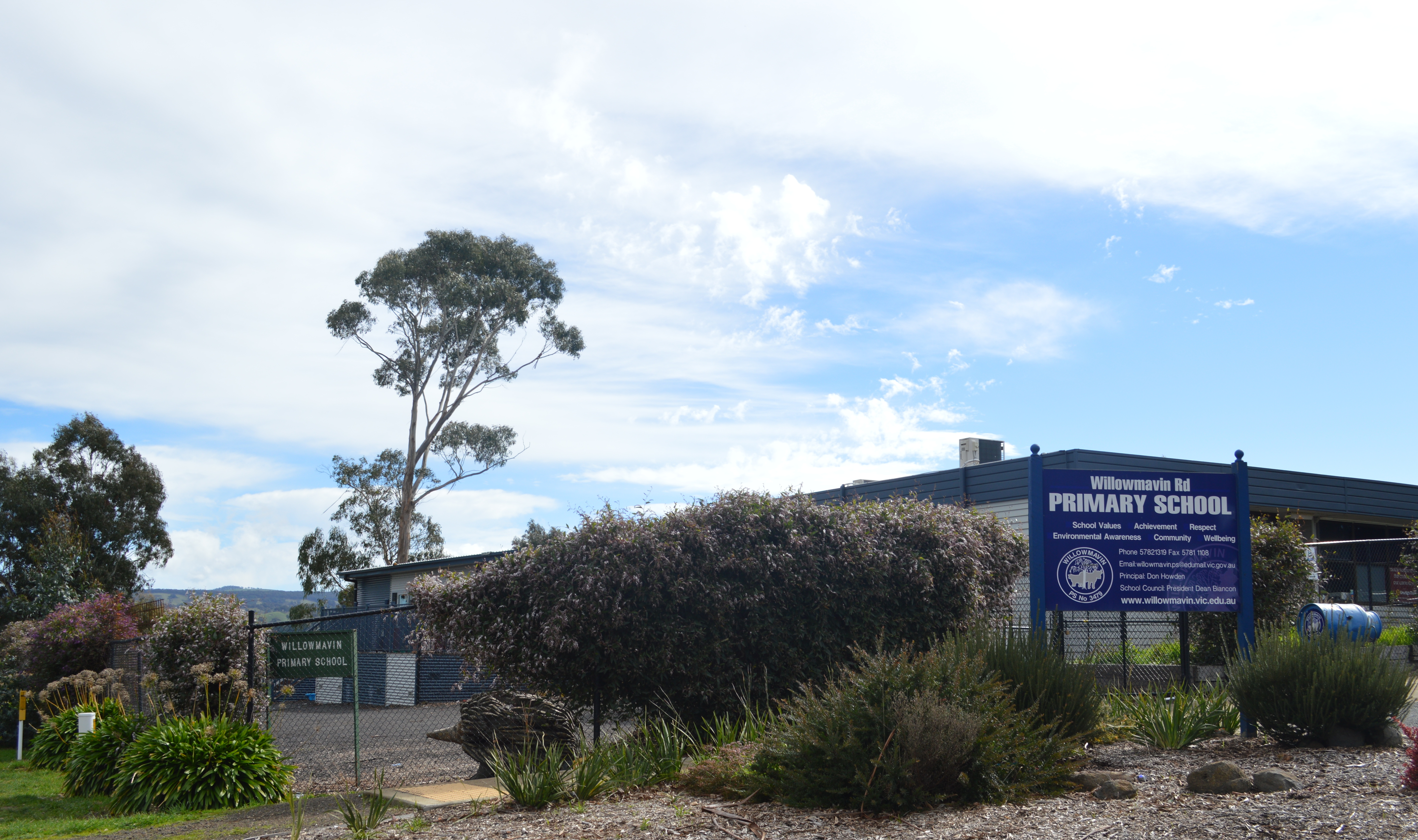
- Willowmavin Road Primary School, 2017

- Coordinates: 37°14′10″S 144°53′11″E
- Country: Australia
- State: Victoria
- Region: Hume
- LGA: Shire of Mitchell
- Location: 73 km (45 mi) N of Melbourne; 9 km (5.6 mi) NW of Kilmore

Government
  - State electorate: Euroa
  - Federal division: Nicholls

Population
  - Total: 185 (2016 census)
- Postcode: 3764

Willowmavin is a locality in central Victoria, Australia. The locality is in the Shire of Mitchell local government area, 73 kilometres (45 mi) north of the state capital, Melbourne.

At the 2016 census, Willowmavin had a population of 216.

== History ==
The traditional owners of Willowmavin are the Taungurong people, a part of the Kulin nation that inhabited a large portion of central Victoria including Port Phillip Bay and its surrounds.

Willowmavin was discovered for European use by the famous Overlander and explorer of the Port Phillip District (later Victoria) and South Australia Charles Bonney on about 21 March 1837 on a journey in which he also blazed the trail of the Sydney Road. Willowmavin was settled by Bonney three months later on about 17 June 1837 as a sheep station and he built his head station diagonally across the road from the Willowmavin Primary school, Kennedy's Lane, Willowmavin. Willowmavin would have had its first European building within a couple of days of Bonney's arrival. p108

Bonney's sheep station was unique because the Kilmore Plains on which it was established were permanently watered by three spring-fed creeks and were highly fertile. Thus they were suited for both grazing and high population small acreage farming. After Bonney left, Bonney's station was held successively by Dr Richard Julian Hamlyn, then the partners Frederick Armand Powlett and John Green.

The most productive part of the property was purchased by William Rutledge on 12 April 1841 in a Special Survey of 5120 acres that was progressively leased or subdivided into small holdings for intensive agriculture whereupon it became the agricultural powerhouse of inland Victoria.

The Kilmore Plains had such a concentration of population that in the first Victorian election of 1851 the district controlled two seats. The United Boroughs of Kilmore, Kyneton and Seymour were dominated by Kilmore township, while the United Counties of Talbot, Dalhousie and Anglesea were dominated the Rutledge Kilmore Special Survey, that by then was also referred to as Willowmavin. As a further demonstration of the importance of the district, the first elected representative of the United Counties was John Pascoe Fawkner, the co-founder of Melbourne.

== Notable people ==
- Charles Bonney, pioneer Overlander and explorer of Victoria and South Australia.
- Frederick Armand Powlett, Captain George Brunswick Smyth, Lieutenant Alfred Miller Mundy, three of the five founders of the Melbourne Cricket Club in 1838. MCC History
- John Pascoe Fawkner, co-founder of Melbourne.
