= Shire of Mitchell =

Coordinates: 37°06′00″S 145°04′00″E

Mitchell Shire
- Local government area
- Location in Victoria

- Interactive map of Mitchell Shire
- Country: Australia
- State: Victoria
- Region: Hume; Goulburn Valley
- Established: 1994
- Council seat: Broadford

Government
  - Mayor: Cr Louise Bannister
  - State electorates: Euroa; Kalkallo; Yan Yean
  - Federal divisions: Bendigo; McEwen; Nicholls

Area
  - Total: 2,862 km^{2} (1,105 sq mi)

Population
  - Total: 61,362
  - Density: 21.440/km^{2} (55.530/sq mi)
- Gazetted: 18 November 1994
- Website: Mitchell Shire
LGAs around Mitchell Shire
Mount Alexander	Greater Bendigo	Strathbogie
Macedon Ranges	Mitchell Shire	Murrindindi
Hume	Whittlesea	Nillumbik

Mitchell Shire is a local government area in the Hume region of Victoria, Australia, located North of Melbourne. It covers an area of 2,862 square kilometres (1,105 mi^{2}) and, in April 2024, had a projected population of 61,362. Larger towns include Beveridge, Broadford, Kilmore, Seymour, Tallarook, Pyalong and Wallan.

The Shire is governed and administered by Mitchell Shire Council; its seat of local government and administrative centre is located at the Council headquarters in Broadford, it also has service centres located in Kilmore, Beveridge, Seymour and Wallan. The Shire is named after an early British surveyor and explorer, Major Thomas Mitchell, who explored the south-eastern part of Australia, and whose return route for his third expedition passed through the present-day LGA.

The Shire is Victoria’s fastest growing regional municipality. By 2041 it is expected that 170,000 people will live in Mitchell Shire. It is anticipated that most of this growth will occur in and around the southern townships of Beveridge, Kilmore/Kilmore East and Wallan.

== History ==
The Mitchell Shire was formed in 1994 from the amalgamation of the Shire of Pyalong, the Shire of Kilmore, most of the Shire of Broadford and Rural City of Seymour, and parts of the Shire of McIvor.

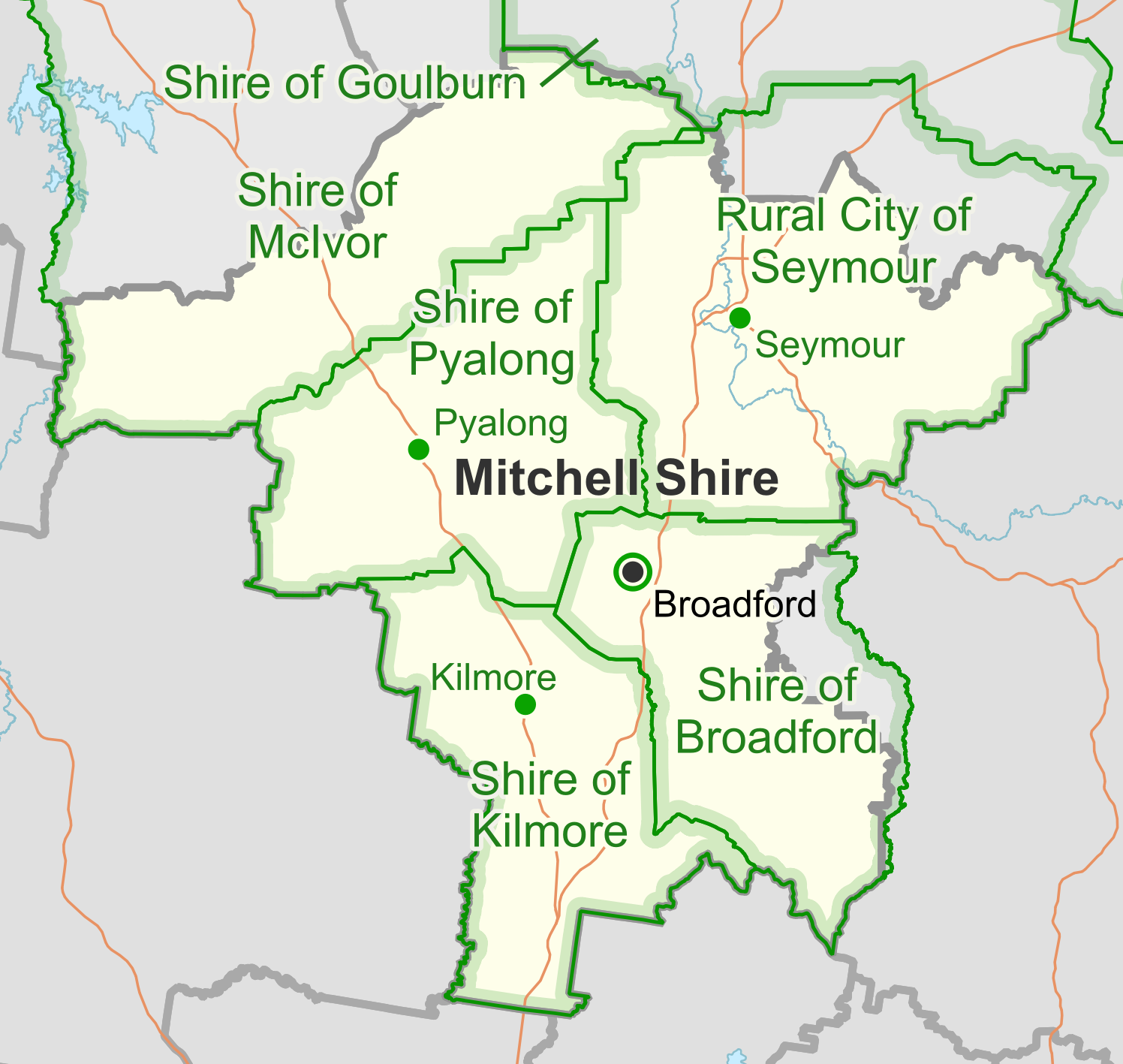
Mitchell Shire's predecessor LGAs (green) as they were in 1994. The administrative centres of the former LGAs are marked by green dots.

== Council ==
=== Current composition ===
2020 and 2024 ward boundaries. Expand the map and click on a ward to see the ward name.

The Council is composed of three wards and nine councillors, with three councillors per ward elected to represent each ward.

Ward	Councillor	Notes
Central	Nathan Clark	Independent.
Central	Timothy Hanson	Independent
Central	Bob Humm	Independent
North	John Dougall (Mayor)	Independent
North	Ned Jeffery	Independent
North	Andrea Pace	Independent
South	Bob Cornish (Deputy Mayor)	Independent
South	Riley Evans	Independent
South	Claudia James	Independent

=== Administration and governance ===
Mitchell Shire Council meets in the Council Chambers at Mitchell Civic Centre in Broadford. It also has Customer and Library Service Centres in Broadford, Kilmore, Seymour and Wallan.

== Townships and localities ==
The population of Mitchell Shire has grown significantly over the early 21st century. According to the Australian Bureau of Statistics Census of Population and Housing, the population was 30,928 in 2006, 34,637 in 2011, 40,918 in 2016, and 49,460 in 2021. The forecast population for 2026 is 69,600.

Locality	2006	2011	2016	2021
Avenel^	815	1,047	1,049	1,112
Beveridge^	1,193	870	2,328	4,642
Broadford	3,621	4,175	4,319	4,592
Bylands^	#	#	131	117
Clonbinane	686	381	333	347
Flowerdale^	#	429	689	790
Forbes	#	#	121	158
Glenaroua	#	#	156	208
Glenhope	#	#	76	66
Glenhope East	#	#	26	17
Heathcote Junction	885	847	838	811
Heathcote South	#	#	18	22
High Camp	#	#	106	122
Highlands^	#	219	122	151
Hilldene	405	452	340	330
Kilmore	5,231	6,678	7,955	9,207
Kilmore East	#	351	418	450
Mangalore^	#	210	180	183
Mia Mia^	#	264	173	213
Moranding	#	#	185	193
Northwood	#	#	193	203
Nulla Vale	#	#	69	96
Puckapunyal	1,177	1,154	1,075	1,108
Pyalong	653	735	660	772
Reedy Creek	#	242	164	157
Seymour	6,301	6,370	6,332	6,569
Sugarloaf Creek	506	314	247	255
Sunday Creek	#	#	309	368
Tallarook	774	789	734	748
Tarcombe^	#	#	39	32
Tooborac	275	404	309	319
Trawool^	#	#	108	90
Tyaak	#	#	70	85
Upper Plenty	504	324	338	415
Wallan	6,641	8,504	11,076	15,004
Wandong	1,533	1,293	1,343	1,477
Waterford Park	205	202	192	217
Whiteheads Creek	522	373	353	347
Willowmavin	474	498	221	241

^ - Territory divided with another LGA
# - Not noted in Census

Emu Flat was a former town in the Shire of Mitchell.

== See also ==
- List of localities (Victoria)
- List of places on the Victorian Heritage Register in the Shire of Mitchell
