= Strath Creek =

- Town
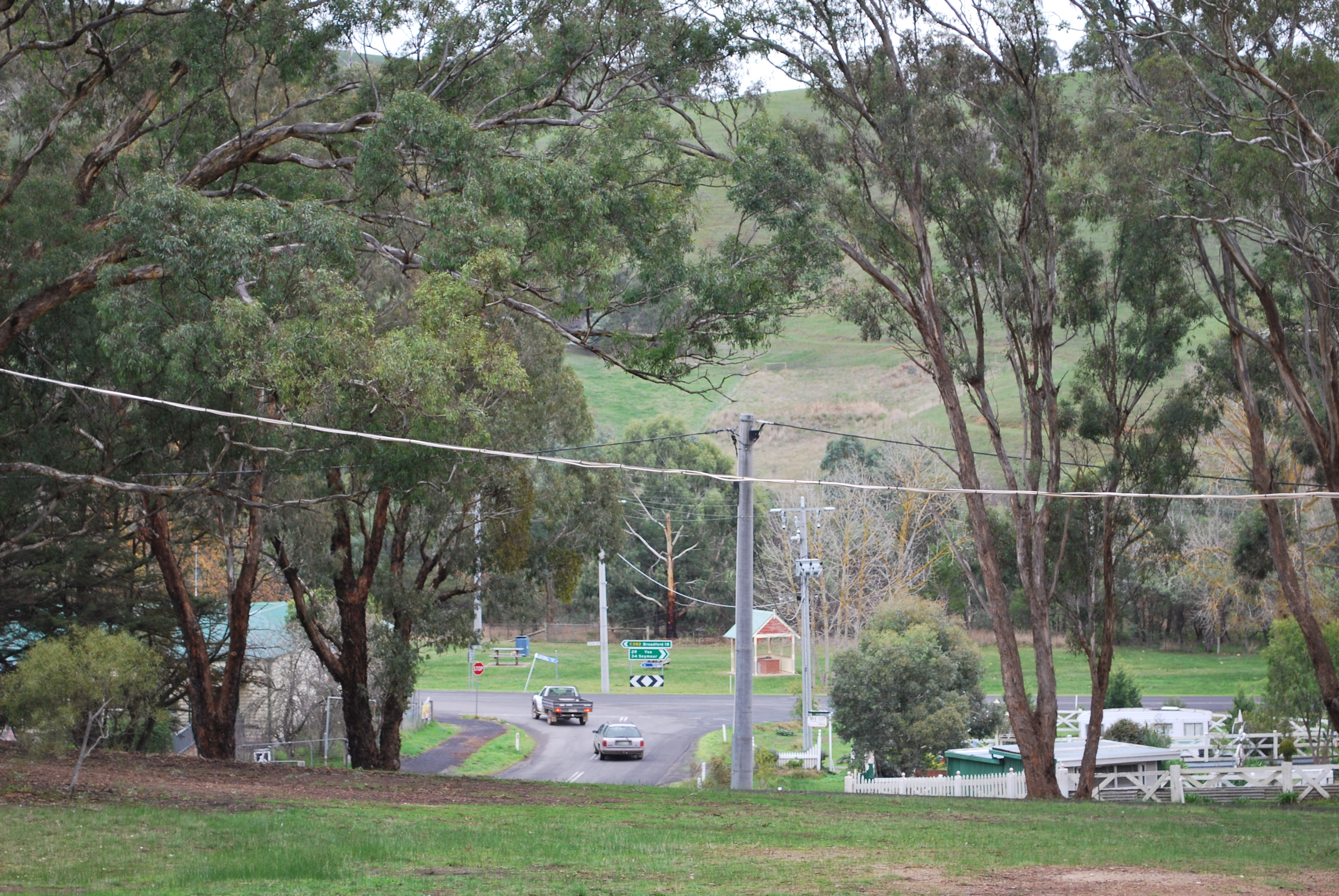
- Looking towards the main intersection at Strath Creek from Pioneer Park

- Coordinates: 37°14′11″S 145°13′16″E
- Country: Australia
- State: Victoria
- Region: Hume
- LGA: Shire of Murrindindi
- Location: 104 km (65 mi) N of Melbourne; 33 km (21 mi) SE of Seymour; 19 km (12 mi) E of Broadford

Government
  - State electorate: Eildon
  - Federal division: Indi

Population
  - Total: 231 (2021 census)
- Postcode: 3658
Localities around Strath Creek
| Tallarook | Kerrisdale | Homewood |
| Reedy Creek | Strath Creek | Flowerdale |
| Reedy Creek | Clonbinane | Seymour |

Strath Creek is a town in central Victoria, Australia. It is in the Shire of Murrindindi local government area, 104 kilometres (65 mi) north of the state capital, Melbourne, on the creek of the same name which flows into King Parrot Creek to the north. At the 2021 census, Strath Creek had a population of 231.

== History ==
Hume and Hovell are regarded as the first Europeans to pass through the Strath Creek valley, in 1824. A cairn recognised their passage is located on the outskirts of the town.

In the following decades, the area attracted fortune seekers who mined for gold in and around Strath Creek and King Parrot Creek. A water wheel from this period was installed at the local Pioneer Reserve and has recently been restored.

The township was mapped out in 1880, and officially named Flowerdale Township in 1884. The change to Strath Creek was made in 1909.

In 1882, work commenced to build a road up Murchison Hill, to the west of the town, to allow transit to the larger town of Broadford.

Strath Creek Post Office opened on 16 April 1885. The growing township also hosted a creamery, a blacksmith, a Hall, a church and a store.

A school opened in the town in 1893.

The Hall and the church are the only buildings that remain of these original premises.

== Today ==
The town was affected by the Black Saturday bushfires in February 2009, with the picturesque Hume and Hovell cricket ground barely escaping the flames. The cricket ground is based on the famous Lord's in England, having the same dimensions and a similar slope.

The local general store burned down shortly after Black Saturday. A new store/cafè opened on the same site in 2023.

The Strath Creek Hotel, which opened in 1909, closed in 2014 and is now a private residence.
