= Sunday Creek (Green River tributary) =

Stream in Washington, U.S.

Coordinates: 47°12′58″N 121°26′58″W

Sunday Creek is a stream in the U.S. state of Washington. It is a tributary of the Green River.

Sunday Creek was first reached by railroad workers on Sunday, hence the name.

== See also ==
- List of rivers of Washington (state)
