= Emu Flat, Victoria =

Emu Flat
- Town
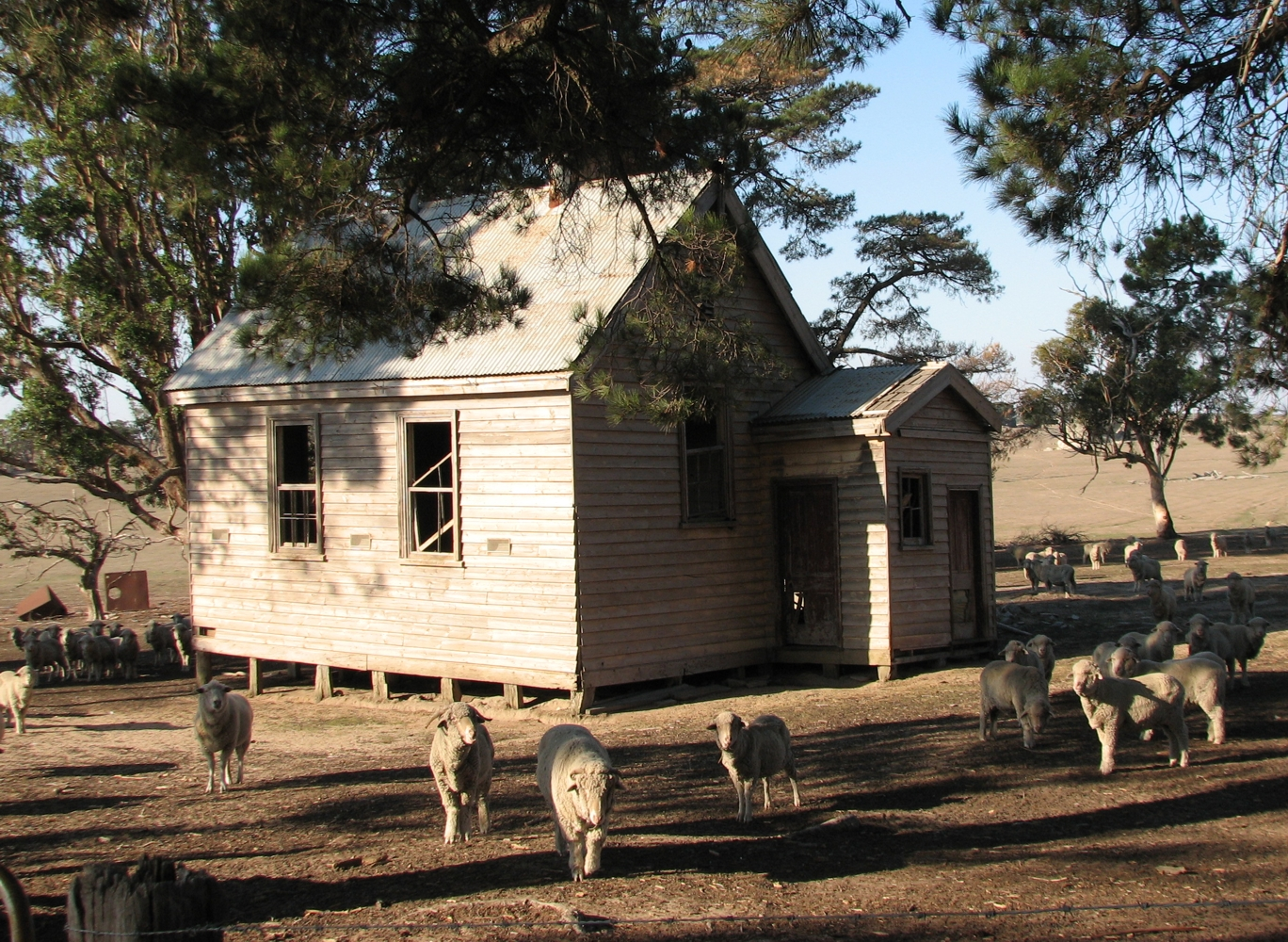
- Former Emu Flat State School

- Coordinates: 37°05′S 144°45′E
- Country: Australia
- State: Victoria
- Region: Hume
- LGA: Shire of Mitchell
- Location: 92 km (57 mi) NW of Melbourne; 23 km (14 mi) N of Lancefield; 20 km (12 mi) S of Tooborac
- Postcode: 3522.

Emu Flat is a locality in the Shire of Mitchell local government area, in Victoria, Australia. It is situated between Lancefield and Tooborac, 92 kilometres to the north-west of Melbourne by road.

Emu Flat has two "heritage places" listed in the Shire of Mitchell Planning Scheme. These are the Uniting Church (formerly Presbyterian Church), and the former State School.

The Emu Flat Post Office opened on 17 September 1877 and closed in 1945.
