= Reedy Creek, Victoria =

Reedy Creek
- Town
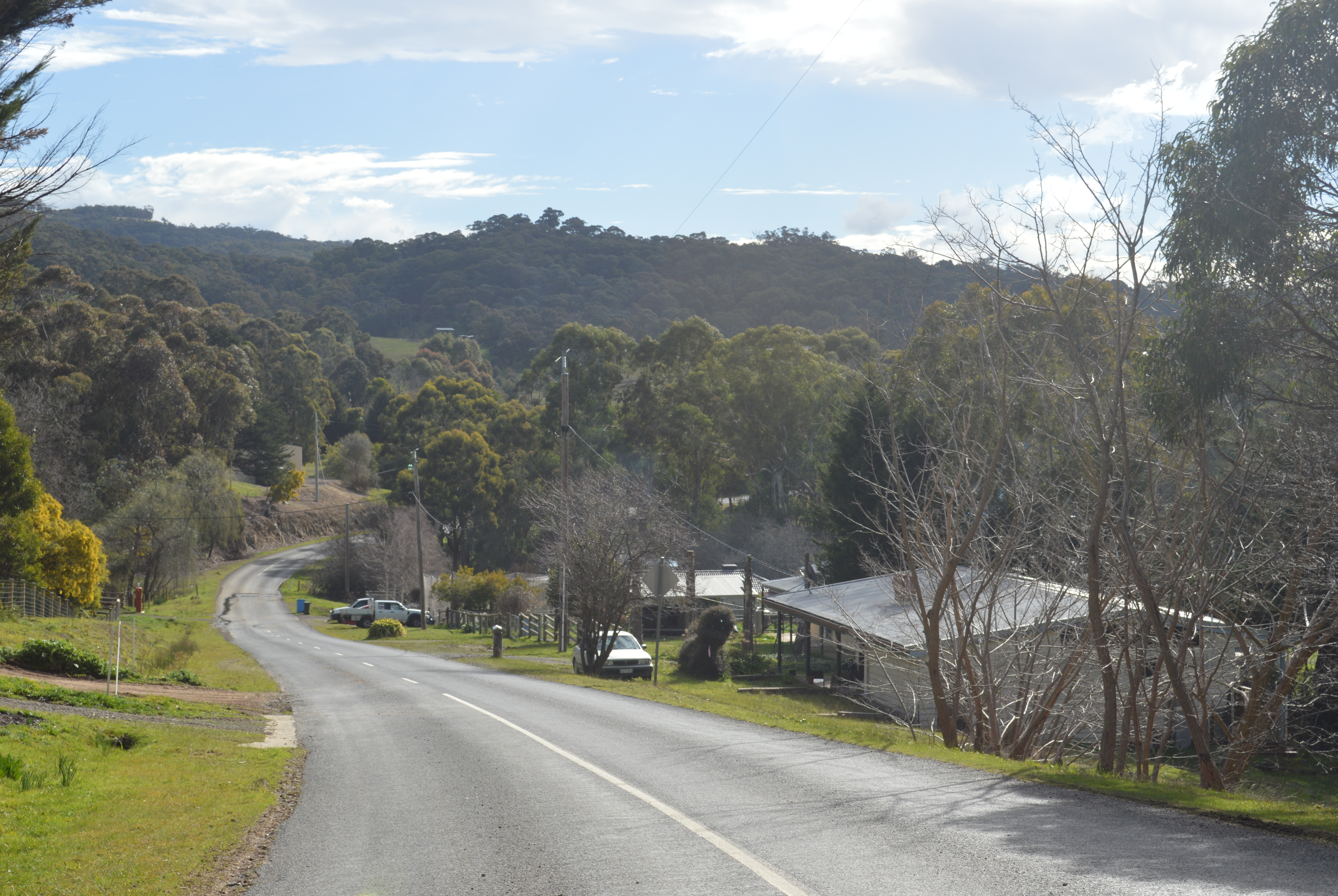
- Doyle St, the main street of Reedy Creek

- Coordinates: 37°15′48″S 145°07′52″E
- Country: Australia
- State: Victoria
- Region: Hume
- LGA: Shire of Mitchell
- Location: 99 km (62 mi) N of Melbourne; 13 km (8.1 mi) SE of Broadford

Government
  - State electorate: Euroa
  - Federal division: Nicholls

Population
  - Total: 166 (2016 census)
- Postcode: 3658

Reedy Creek is a locality in central Victoria, Australia. The locality is in the Shire of Mitchell local government area, 99 kilometres (62 mi) north of the state capital, Melbourne. It is at 358 metres (1175 feet) elevation. It is approximately 15 minutes from Broadford, Vic, 3658.

At the 2016 census, Reedy Creek had a population of 166.

The town was established in 1861 for gold mining purposes, with housing, a school, pubs, and other buildings being built. The school was closed in 1967 and turned into the town hall, the post office was closed in 1965, and by 1903 only two pubs were open, both of which are now closed. The town was named for the creek that runs around it and under the bridge at the town's entrance. The creek is only filled by large rainfalls, and for most of the year it is dry. The town is also surrounded by bushland, and is in a valley.
