= Charles Bonney =

Australian politician

Mr Charles Bonney
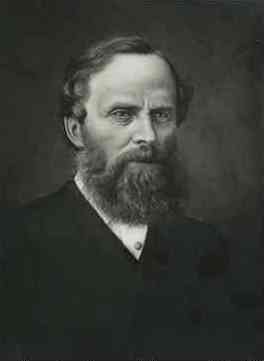

South Australian Commissioner of Crown Lands and Immigration
- In office 24 October 1856 – 21 August 1857
- Premier: Boyle Finniss
- Succeeded by: William Milne

Member of the South Australian Parliament for East Torrens
- In office 26 February 1857 – 26 January 1858 Serving with George Waterhouse, Lavington Glyde
- Preceded by: New District
- Succeeded by: John Barrow

Personal details
- Born: 31 October 1813 Sandon, Staffordshire, England.
- Died: 14 March 1897 (aged 83) Woollahra, New South Wales

Charles Bonney (31 October 1813 – 15 March 1897) was a pioneer and politician in Australia.

== Early life ==
Bonney was the youngest son of the Rev. George Bonney, a fellow of Jesus College, Cambridge, and his wife Susanna, née Knight. He was born at Sandon, Staffordshire, England. After his father died in 1826 his brother Thomas, headmaster of Rugeley Grammar School, gave him an education and a home for seven years. (Two of Thomas's sons, Edward and Frederic Bonney, later went to Australia.)

== Pioneering in Australia ==
Bonney left Britain on 5 August 1834 in the John Craig and arrived at Sydney on 12 December 1834. This was up to twenty times a typical ship load of sheep, eliminated catastrophic losses of entire ship loads and transformed the economics of the wool industry in Victoria as other overlanders followed his path. On about 21 March 1837 he discovered the rich, fertile Kilmore Plains in a journey that included blazing the trail of the Sydney Road. Kilmore became the inland agricultural powerhouse of the infant State of Victoria. These discoveries had a major impact on the economy of Victoria. p108 p117. Bonney later wrote that amongst his proudest achievements were founding the fertile district of Kilmore and the route of the Sydney Road.

== See also ==
- French Australian
