= Broadford, Victoria =

Broadford
- Town
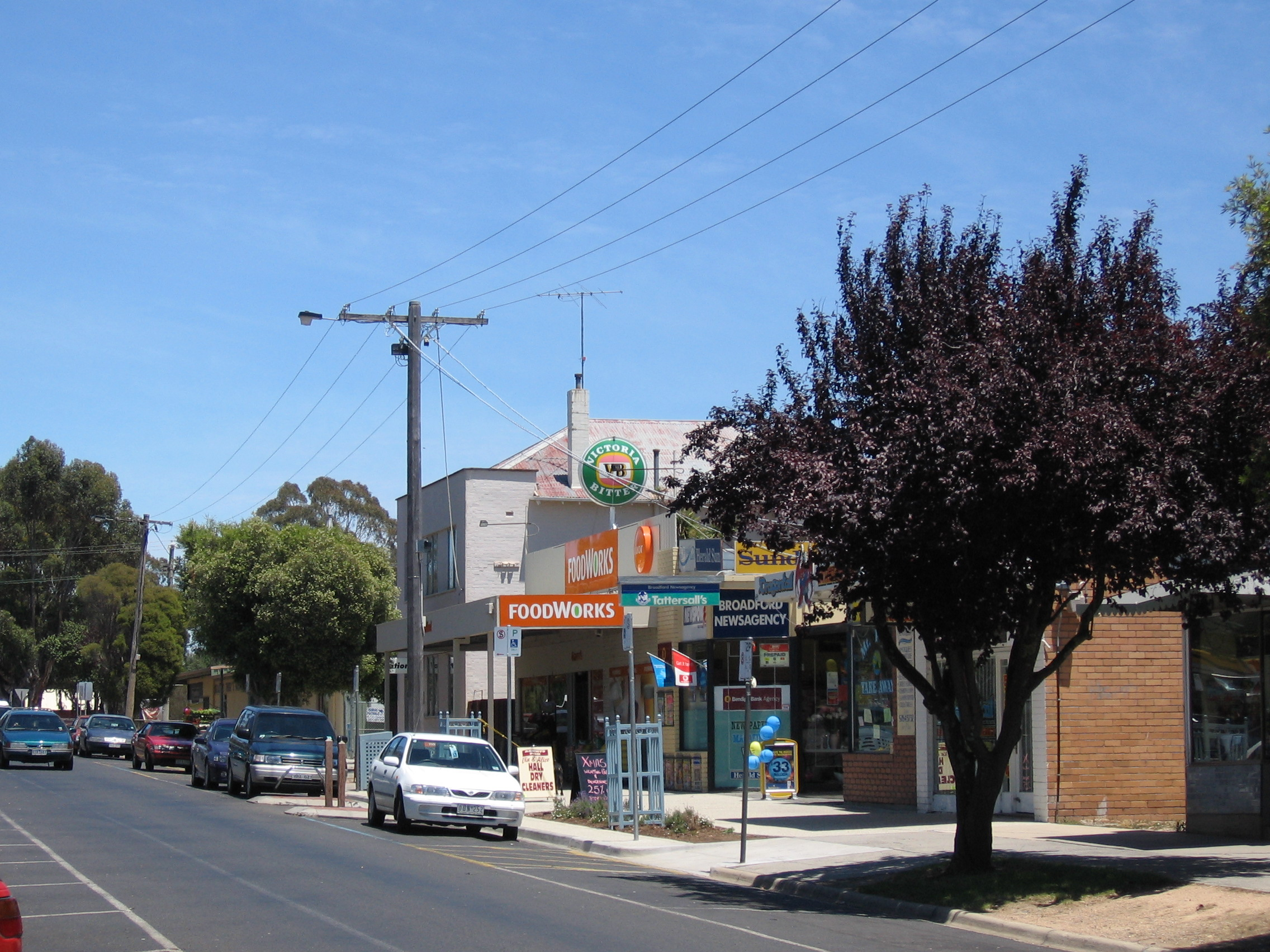
- Broadford

- Interactive map of Broadford
- Coordinates: 37°12′S 145°04′E
- Country: Australia
- State: Victoria
- Region: Hume
- LGA: Shire of Mitchell
- Location: 73 km (45 mi) N of Melbourne; 27 km (17 mi) S of Seymour; 15 km (9.3 mi) NE of Kilmore

Government
  - State electorate: Euroa
  - Federal division: Nicholls
- Elevation: 145.0 m (475.7 ft)

Population
  - Total: 4,076 (2021 census)
- Postcode: 3658
- Mean max temp: 21.1 °C (70.0 °F)
- Mean min temp: 7.6 °C (45.7 °F)
- Annual rainfall: 593.4 mm (23.36 in)
Localities around Broadford
| Sugarloaf Creek | Tallarook | Strath Creek |
| Willowmavin | Broadford | Strath Creek |
| Kilmore | Wandong | Clonbinane |

Broadford is a town in central Victoria, Australia. At the 2021 census, Broadford had a population of 4,076. The town is the headquarters of the Shire of Mitchell local government area and is approximately 73 kilometres (50 mi) north of the state capital, Melbourne.

Broadford lies on the major transport routes between Melbourne and Sydney. The town is bypassed to the east by the Hume Freeway and the railway line linking the two cities passes through Broadford. Broadford is located on the banks of Sunday Creek, a tributary of the Goulburn River and is set amongst dramatic central Victorian scenery.

== History ==
The original inhabitants of Broadford are the Taungurung people, a part of the Kulin nation that inhabited a large portion of central Victoria including Port Phillip Bay and its surrounds. A 1934 document recalling the 1870s notes the "Puckapunyal tribe, and there were about twenty in number. … I knew four of them fairly well, one of whom was called Billy Hamilton (and claimed to be the son of the Chief of the Puckapunyal tribe) his lubra, Mary, Gelibrand and Lankey."

Hamilton Hume and Captain William Hilton Hovell were the first Europeans to set foot on the future township of Broadford during their pioneering journey into inland Victoria in 1824. Hovell recorded that on Sunday 12 December, the party reached the top of the Murchison Gap east of Broadford and took a compass bearing of the 'remarkable' Sugarloaf Hill that they could see. They named it Mount Piper and noted its dramatic triangular shape. The bearing was written as "W. b. S" which is the navigator's standard compass point of west by south or 258.75 degrees. It is nearly due west to the layman.

The party continued on that bearing, crossed Black Swamp Gully, and reached the confluence of Dry Creek (Sunday Creek tributary)|Dry Creek with Sunday Creek, now the township of Broadford, where they camped for the night. They named the larger creek as Sunday Creek.

This meant that Broadford was also the first future township in Victoria where Europeans camped overnight.

The next morning they were forced to travel for seven miles along Sunday Creek in a south by east direction (nearly due south), before they could find a crossing over its muddy banks at the now Waterford Park. They then proceeded on through the middle of Wandong and crossed the Dividing Range at Hume's Pass.

The first European resident of the townsite of Broadford was Lt. Col. Henry White who was reported as being "of Mount Piper" in October 1838. Mount Piper, which today is known for its natural beauty and unique butterfly fauna is located within the boundary of Broadford. White was the first recorded land holder in the vicinity. The first survey map of the region in 1842 shows Colonel White's Station on Sunday Creek only 4 km downstream of its junction with Dry Creek. That junction became the future townsite of Broadford.

This map also shows Gideon Stewart's sheep station exactly on the future Broadford townsite, 9 chains (181 metres) east of the junction of Dry Creek with Sunday Creek. Stewart arrived from Hobart and took out a licence for a sheep station from 1 July 1840.

Stewart was an associate of the well known Hobart publican Reay Clarke. Clarke left Hobart and set up an inn at the location of Stewart's sheep station in 1843. The location was referred to as "Clarke's Ford" in October, 1843. Clarke was granted a General Licence for the "Broadfoot" Inn, Sunday Creek on 27 April 1844. By April 1845 it was recorded as "Broadford" Inn.

In 1842, the Sunday Creek Inn (beside the creek named by Hume and Hovell in 1824) and Stockyard Inn were built to cater for passing trade. Blacksmiths and small stores soon appeared and the town was gazetted in 1854 with original allotments selling at £2 a piece. The area between the two inns became the focal point of business and leisure activities.

An area traditionally connected with Broadford has been Sugarloaf Creek, Victoria. The Sugarloaf Creek Station near Broadford was the first inland settlement in Victoria when it was set up by Charles Ebden and Charles Bonney on about 14 March 1837.

Gold was discovered in 1858 in the nearby Reedy Creek, and later at Strath Creek and Sunday Creek but was not long-lived.

The Post Office opened on 1 July 1852. The North East railway line was built through the town in 1872.

The Broadford Courier printing office was opened in 1891, operating until 1978. It is maintained as a historical site by the Broadford Historical Society.

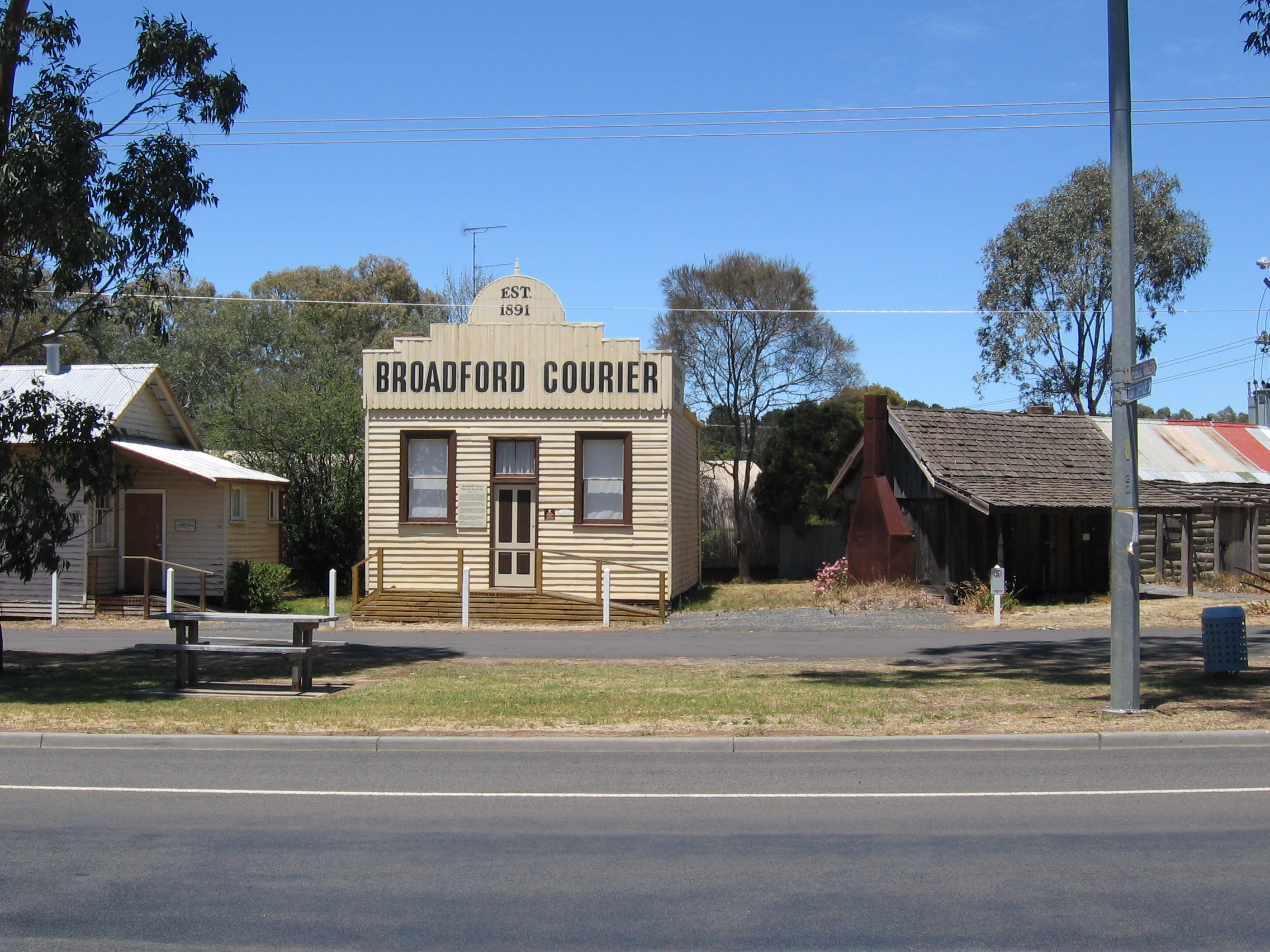
Broadford Courier printing office

The Broadford Magistrates' Court ceased operation in July 1980 and was formally closed in November 1981. The former courthouse was subsequently used by a local religious group.

On 7 February 2009, Broadford was a part of the Black Saturday bushfires, with the Kilmore East Fire which saw 119 deaths, 232 injured and 1,242 homes lost.

== The town today ==
Industry in Broadford includes a paper mill, the Broadford Mill. It opened in 1890, built by James McDougall. Now named the Australian Paper Mill and owned by National Paper Industries, it no longer produces paper but products for the packaging and allied industries. There is also a Nestlé factory. The town's substantial reserves of fine white kaolin clay are used both as a medical absorbent and for the manufacture of pottery. It has a primary school, a secondary college and a kindergarten.

Broadford is also home to the Victorian State Motorcycle Complex, which has both road and off-road tracks, and hosts National riding events, as well as amateur track days. In 2014 Calibre Sports Inc. leased some land on the complex and in 2015 the complex hosted the Tough Mudder Australia event.

Popular sports in Broadford include Australian rules football and the town has a team, the Kangaroos, competing in the Outer East Football League. The Broadford juniors play in the Seymour Junior Football Netball League.

Lawn bowls is played at the club located next door to the Lions Park on the old caravan park grounds.

Broadford cricket club has three seniors teams playing across A, B and C grade, the club also has several junior teams competing in the U11's and U13's age groups.

Golfers play at the Broadford Golf Club on Horwood Road.

Broadford is home to the Mitchell Rangers Soccer club (est. 2003), located at the Broadford Sport Pavilion. They have junior and senior teams.

As Broadford is expected to grow substantially in the future, and Mitchellshire Council has created a broad systymatic vision for the town.

== RSL fire ==
On the night of 9 January 2008 firefighters were called to a blaze at the Broadford RSL, but there was little crews could do to save the weatherboard hall. The Country Fire Authority's Scott Hamilton says the blaze caused about $300,000 damage to the building and destroyed its contents.

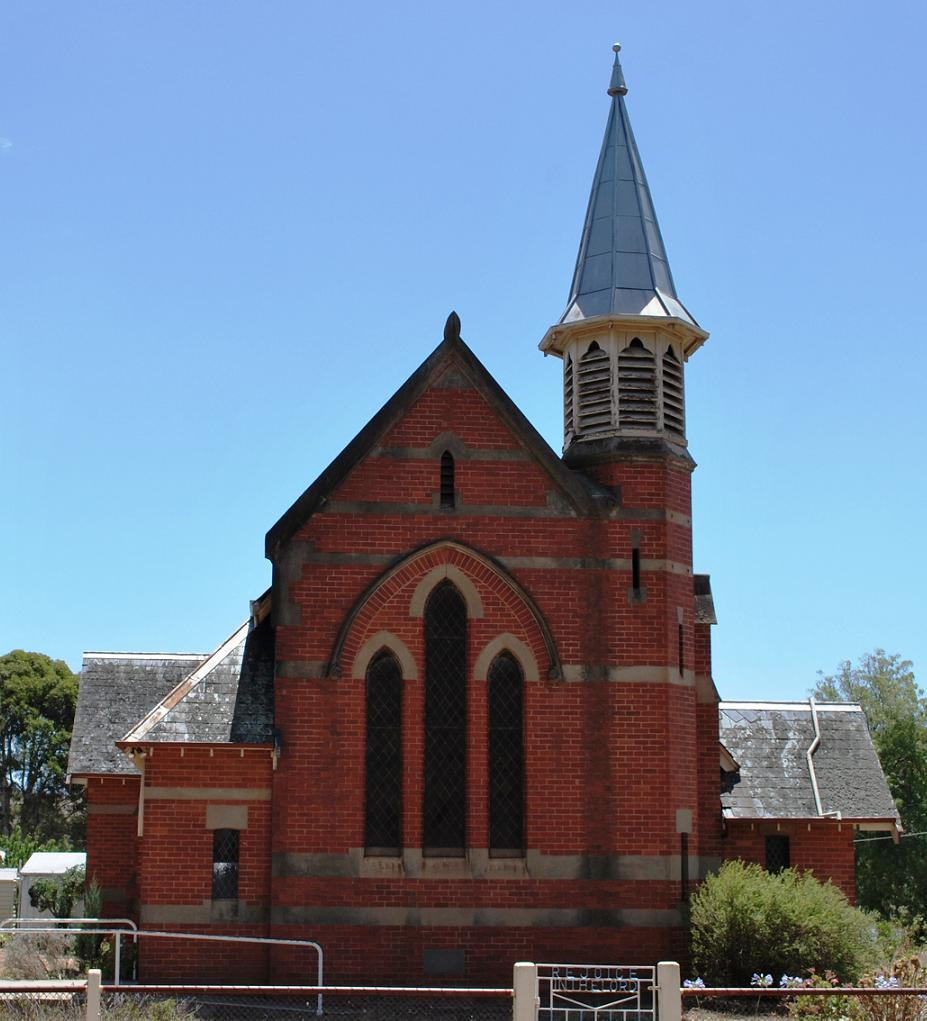
Broadford Presbyterian Church

== Climate ==
Broadford has an oceanic climate (Köppen: Cfb), with hot, dry summers and cool winters. Average maxima vary from 29.5 °C (85.1 °F) in January to 12.6 °C (54.7 °F) in July, while average minima fluctuate between 12.9 °C (55.2 °F) in February and 2.9 °C (37.2 °F) in July. Precipitation is moderately low (averaging 593.4 mm (23.36 in) per annum), and is spread across 94.0 precipitation days. All climate data was sourced from Seymour, located 27 km (17 mi) north of Broadford.

Climate data for Broadford (sourced from Seymour) (37.03°S 145.15°E, 145 m AMSL) (1880-2024 normals & extremes)
| Month | Jan | Feb | Mar | Apr | May | Jun | Jul | Aug | Sep | Oct | Nov | Dec | Year |
|---|---|---|---|---|---|---|---|---|---|---|---|---|---|
| Mean daily maximum °C (°F) | 29.5 (85.1) | 29.3 (84.7) | 26.1 (79.0) | 21.1 (70.0) | 16.7 (62.1) | 13.3 (55.9) | 12.6 (54.7) | 14.3 (57.7) | 17.3 (63.1) | 20.6 (69.1) | 24.3 (75.7) | 27.6 (81.7) | 21.1 (69.9) |
| Mean daily minimum °C (°F) | 12.7 (54.9) | 12.9 (55.2) | 10.8 (51.4) | 7.7 (45.9) | 5.2 (41.4) | 3.4 (38.1) | 2.9 (37.2) | 3.4 (38.1) | 5.2 (41.4) | 6.9 (44.4) | 9.1 (48.4) | 11.4 (52.5) | 7.6 (45.7) |
| Average precipitation mm (inches) | 35.9 (1.41) | 34.5 (1.36) | 40.0 (1.57) | 44.3 (1.74) | 54.8 (2.16) | 64.7 (2.55) | 59.7 (2.35) | 62.5 (2.46) | 56.5 (2.22) | 54.6 (2.15) | 46.3 (1.82) | 39.0 (1.54) | 593.4 (23.36) |
| Average precipitation days (≥ 0.2 mm) | 4.4 | 4.0 | 4.8 | 6.1 | 9.2 | 11.1 | 12.4 | 11.8 | 9.9 | 8.6 | 6.5 | 5.2 | 94 |
Source: Bureau of Meteorology (1880-2024 normals & extremes)

== Notable residents ==
Notable people from Broadford include

- Barry Hall, Australian rules footballer
- Alan Ezard, Australian rules footballer
- Richard Douglas, Australian rules footballer
- Thomas George Wittingslow, founder of Wittingslow Amusements
