= Kilmore, Victoria =

Kilmore
- Town
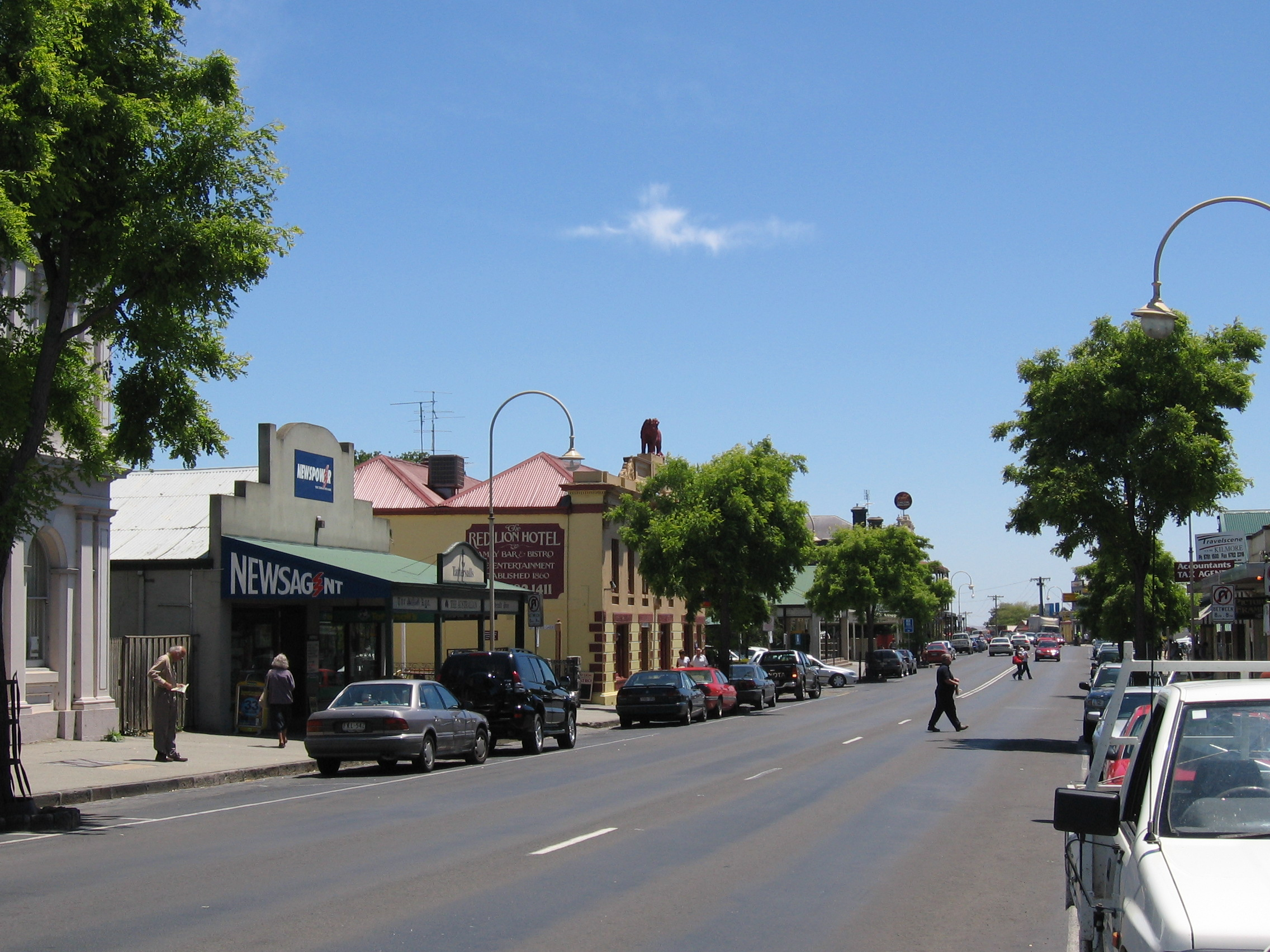
- The main street of Kilmore, c.2006

- Interactive map of Kilmore
- Coordinates: 37°17′0″S 144°57′0″E
- Country: Australia
- State: Victoria
- Region: Hume
- LGA: Shire of Mitchell
- Location: 65 km (40 mi) from Melbourne; 40 km (25 mi) from Seymour

Government
  - State electorate: Euroa
  - Federal division: Nicholls
- Elevation: 370 m (1,210 ft)

Population
  - Total: 9,207 (2021 census)
- Postcode: 3764
Localities around Kilmore
Willowmavin	Willowmavin	Broadford
Willowmavin	Kilmore	Wandong
Wallan	Wallan	Wandong

Kilmore (/ˈkɪlmɔːr/) is a town in the Australian state of Victoria. Located 65 kilometres (40 mi) north of Melbourne, it is the oldest inland town in Victoria by the combination of age and physical occupation, and because it had unique agricultural attributes to drive that earliest settlement. It grew very rapidly to become four times bigger than its nearest inland rival by 1851. Its spectacular growth continued to match that of the major gold mining towns of Ballarat, Bendigo and Beechworth until at least 1861.

== History ==
The traditional owners of Kilmore and the Kilmore Plains are the Taungurung people, a part of the Kulin nation that inhabited a large portion of central Victoria including Port Phillip Bay and its surrounds. The Tommy McRae artwork held by the National Gallery of Australia depicts the "Kilmore Tribe Holding Corroboree", and a child pioneer of Kilmore, James Hamilton, describes in detail just such a corroboree at Kilmore in 1845. In 1866, a Taungurung elder, Lanky, reported to the Kilmore Free Press that the native name of Kilmore was Mulmialinuck.

Kilmore was discovered for European use by the famous Overlander and explorer of the Port Phillip District (later Victoria) and South Australia Charles Bonney on about 21 March 1837, at which time he also blazed the track of the Sydney Road to Melbourne. His track formed the main highway between the capital cities for 139 years. Kilmore was settled by Bonney on about 17 June 1837 as a sheep station and he built Bonney's Outstation on the townsite itself. Kilmore would have had its first European building within a couple of days of Bonney's arrival.

Bonney's sheep station was unique because the Kilmore Plains on which it was established were permanently watered by three spring-fed creeks and were highly fertile. Thus they were suited for both grazing and high population small acreage farming. After Bonney left, the station was held successively by Dr Richard Julian Hamlyn, then the partners Frederick Armand Powlett and John Green.

The most productive part of the property was purchased by William Rutledge on 12 April 1841 in a Special Survey of 5,120 acres (2,070 ha) and was progressively leased or subdivided into small holdings for intensive agriculture whereupon it became the agricultural powerhouse of inland Victoria. Rutledge named Kilmore for his home place in Ireland at Kilmore, County Cavan.

The Kilmore Plains had such a concentration of population that in the first Victorian election of 1851 the district controlled two seats. The United Boroughs of Kilmore, Kyneton and Seymour were dominated by Kilmore township, while the United Counties of Talbot, Dalhousie and Anglesea were dominated by the Rutledge Kilmore Special Survey. By 1856, Kilmore was the largest town on the entire Sydney Road between Melbourne and Sydney, and was 30% larger than its nearest rival, the later city of Goulburn. As a further demonstration of the importance of the district, the first elected representative of the United Counties was John Pascoe Fawkner, the co-founder of Melbourne.

Between 1856 and 1865 the seat of Kilmore was the electorate of the Irish-born John O'Shanassy (1818–83) who had three stints as Premier of Victoria between 1857 and 1863.Victoria Premiers

O'Shanassy, an Irish Catholic, was the bane of the Protestant establishment in Melbourne and the ensuing sectarianism also affected those who lived in Kilmore. O'Shanassy's supporters were referred to as 'O'Rowdies' and O'Shanassy as the 'Rowdy King". A Melbourne Punch cartoon "Freedom of Election at Kilmore" depicted the 1859 election day in the town as a wild barney of Irishmen.

Kilmore was a stronghold of early Celtic settlers from Ireland, Scotland and Cornwall, and remains a strong Celtic area to this day. The town hosts a market on the last Saturday of each month, and a Celtic Festival each June.

Kilmore Post Office opened on 1 February 1843 and, with Ovens (later Wangaratta) which opened the same day, were the fifth and sixth to open in the Port Phillip District and the first two inland offices.

Many of Kilmore's oldest extant buildings are made of bluestone including the hospital, old court house, former post office, some churches, a gaol, and a monument to Hume and Hovell near the golf course.

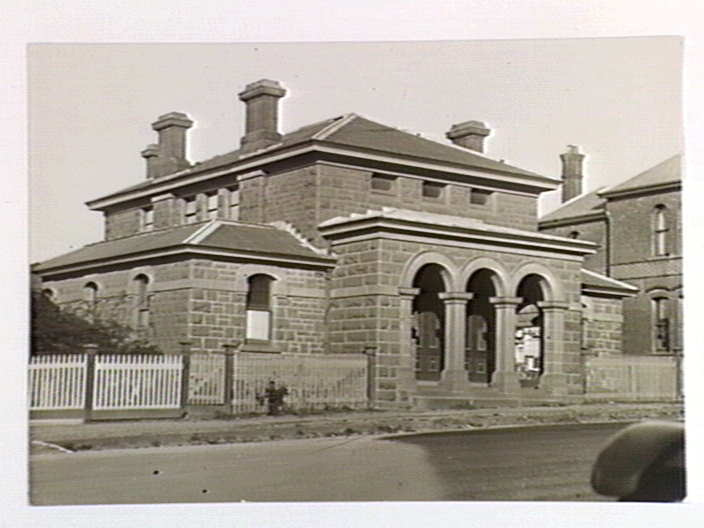
The Kilmore courthouse, 30 June 1933

The Kilmore Magistrates' Court closed on 1 January 1990.

== Population ==
At the 2021 census, Kilmore had a population of 9,207. 80.9% of people were born in Australia. The next most common countries of birth were England 3.3% and India 1.3%. 86.9% of people only spoke English at home. The most common responses for religion were No Religion 40.9%, Catholic 29.0%, and Anglican 10.5%.

== Public Transport ==
Kilmore is serviced by a V/Line railway station on the Seymour line.

The locality is also serviced by Mitchell Transit - providing a Town Bus route and intra municipal service covering the towns of Wallan, Kilmore, Broadford and Seymour within the Mitchell Shire.

== Railway ==
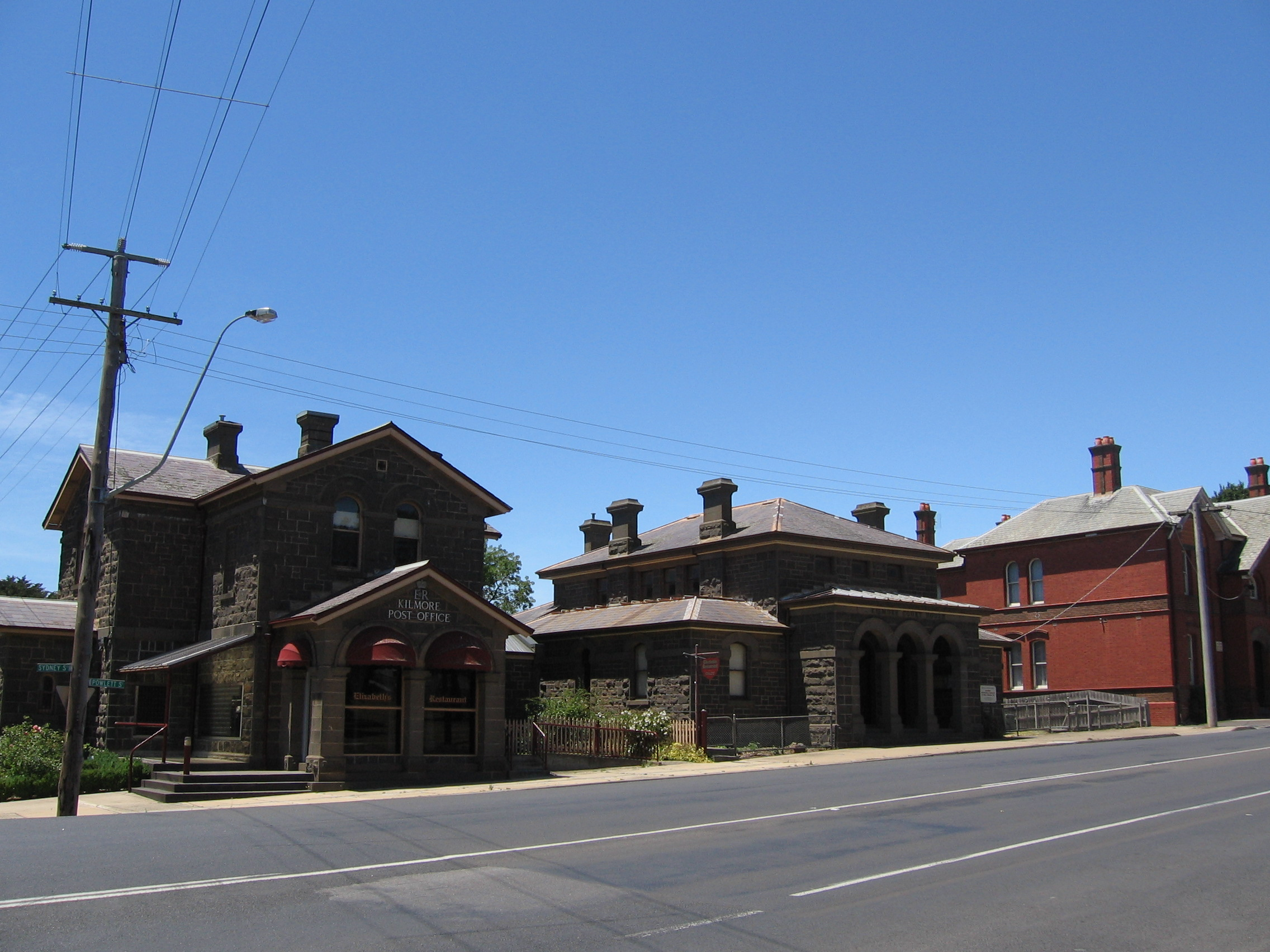
The old Post Office and Courthouse at Kilmore

A railway used to ascend from Heathcote Junction on the Sydney–Melbourne line, passed through Kilmore with the main branch running onto Bendigo; while a white elephant branch line ran out to Lancefield until dismantled during 1914. The Bendigo line was truncated to Heathcote in 1958 and closed in 1969 and then dismantled. An operational tram museum utilises part of the old railway right of way between Kilmore and Bylands. Still today, many parts of the track are still in place like the old cobblestone platform of the original railway station. Most of this though has been built over or grown over.

Kilmore is served by a railway station at Kilmore East, on the main line. The Post Office at Kilmore East opened on 1 September 1872 as Gavan Duffy and was renamed Kilmore East two months later and closed in 1976.

== Media ==
Though Kilmore is located relatively close to Melbourne, it still retains the "Township" atmosphere. It is serviced by Melbourne radio and Television, and also offers local media services.

The local newspaper is The North Central Review.

Radio - 98.3 OKR FM (Community Radio), Narrow-cast Radio - 87.6 Hit FM (youth Radio Service) Narrow-cast

== Education ==
The town has two private secondary schools and two primary schools; Kilmore Primary School, St Patrick's Primary school, Assumption College, and the Kilmore International School. The Kilmore International school (TKIS) is the only school in Australia to exclusively use the International Baccalaureate and not offer a local high school qualification such as the VCE. The Australian Training College is also based in Kilmore and has been operating since 1994 delivering a range of nationally accredited courses including hospitality, management, training and assessment, horticulture to name a few.

== Notable people ==
- Charles Bonney, pioneer Overlander and explorer of Victoria and South Australia.
- John Pascoe Fawkner, co-founder of Melbourne.
- Johnny Gilbert, bushranger, member of Ben Hall's gang.
- Alice Heron Maxwell, custodian.
- Lieutenant Leslie Maygar, recipient of the Victoria Cross for his actions in the Boer War (1899-1902).
- Tony McNamara, screenwriter, playwright and producer twice Academy Award-nominated
- Pat O'Dea, former collegiate punter for the Wisconsin Badgers. 1962 inductee into College Football Hall of Fame.
- John O'Shanassy, Premier of Victoria.
- Frederick Armand Powlett, Captain George Brunswick Smyth, Lieutenant Alfred Miller Mundy, three of the five founders of the Melbourne Cricket Club in 1838. MCC History
- Caroline Reed Robertson, convicted murderer who murdered 15-year-old Rachel Barber and buried her body in a shallow grave in her father's farm
- Blake Shinn, Melbourne Cup winning jockey
- Cooper Webster, racing driver

== See also ==
- Old Kilmore Gaol
