= Little River (Cathedral Range) =

Little
- Location of the Little River mouth in Victoria

Location
- Country: Australia
- State: Victoria
- Region: South Eastern Highlands (IBRA), Northern Country/North Central
- LGA: Murrindindi

Physical characteristics
- Source: Cathedral Range, Great Dividing Range
  - location: below The Knobs
  - coordinates: 37°27′08″S 145°50′22″E
  - elevation: 1,340 m (4,400 ft)
- Mouth: confluence with the Acheron River
  - location: at Taggerty
  - coordinates: 37°19′20″S 145°42′40″E
  - elevation: 208 m (682 ft)
- Length: 22 km (14 mi)

Basin features
- River system: Goulburn Broken catchment, Murray-Darling basin
- State park: Cathedral Range State Park

The Little River, a minor inland perennial river of the Goulburn Broken catchment, part of the Murray-Darling basin, is located in the lower South Eastern Highlands bioregion and Northern Country/North Central regions of the Australian state of Victoria. The headwaters of the Little River rise below the Cathedral Range and descend to flow into the Acheron River at Taggerty.

== Location and features ==
The river rises in the Blue Range below Tweed Spur within Cathedral Range, part of the Great Dividing Range, within the Cathedral Range State Park and flows generally northwest, through the Rubicon State Forest and a rugged state park as the river descends, before reaching its confluence with the Acheron River at Taggerty. The river descends 1,140 metres (3,740 ft) over its 22-kilometre (14 mi) course.

The river is crossed by the Maroondah Highway, near its mouth at Taggerty.

== See also ==
- List of rivers of Australia § Victoria
