= Stevenson Falls (disambiguation) =

Stevenson Falls may refer to:

- A common misspelling of Steavenson Falls on the Steavenson River near Marysville, Victoria, Australia (east of Melbourne)
- Stevensons Falls in the Great Otway National Park, Victoria, Australia (southwest of Melbourne)
