= Taggerty River =

Taggerty
- Location of the Taggerty River mouth in Victoria
- Etymology: Aboriginal Taungurong: blue pigment or clay or stain

Location
- Country: Australia
- State: Victoria
- Region: South Eastern Highlands bioregion (IBRA), Northern Country/North Central
- Local government area: Murrindindi
- Towns: Marysville

Physical characteristics
- Source: Yarra Ranges, Great Dividing Range
  - location: below Lake Mountain
  - coordinates: 37°29′52″S 145°52′37″E
  - elevation: 1,420 m (4,660 ft)
- Mouth: confluence with the Steavenson River
  - location: near Marysville
  - coordinates: 37°29′13″S 145°45′19″E
  - elevation: 368 m (1,207 ft)
- Length: 18 km (11 mi)

Basin features
- River system: Goulburn Broken catchment, Murray-Darling basin
- Tributaries
  - right: Whitehouse Creek
- National park: Yarra Ranges National Park

The Taggerty River, a minor inland perennial river of the Goulburn Broken catchment, part of the Murray-Darling basin, is located in the lower South Eastern Highlands bioregion and Northern Country/North Central regions of the Australian state of Victoria. The headwaters of the Taggerty River rise on the north–western slopes of the Yarra Ranges, below Lake Mountain and descend to flow into the Steavenson River near Marysville.

== Location and features ==
The river rises below Lake Mountain on the north–western slopes of the Yarra Ranges, part of the Great Dividing Range, within the Yarra Ranges National Park. The flows generally west, through rugged national park as the river descends, joined by one minor tributary, before reaching its confluence with the Steavenson River near the settlement of Marysville. The river descends 1,050 metres (3,440 ft) over its 18-kilometre (11 mi) course.

Much of the catchment area of the river was destroyed by the Black Saturday bushfires that passed through the area on 7 February 2009, destroying almost all of the man made infrastructure and causing extensive damage to the forest in the area.

== Etymology ==
The river derives its name from the Aboriginal Taungurong word taggarty. It is recorded that Aborigines used to gather a blue pigment or clay on the banks of the Taggerty River and use the stain on their bodies.

It is believed that the lower reaches of the Steavenson River, from the confluence of the Taggerty River with the Steavenson River, at the locale of Vic Oak, until the river mouth near Buxton, may have been initially named as the Taggerty River, until the Steavenson was officially named.

== See also ==
- List of rivers of Australia § Victoria
