= Steavenson =

Steavenson is a surname. Notable people with the surname include:

- Addison Langhorne Steavenson (1836–1913), English Mining Engineer
- Wendell Steavenson (born 1970), American journalist, and writer
- William Herbert Steavenson FRAS (1894–1975), English amateur astronomer

== See also ==
- Steavenson Falls, a waterfall on the Steavenson River
- Steavenson River in the Australian state of Victoria
- Stephenson
- Stevenson
