= Acheron River (Victoria) =

River in Victoria, Australia

Acheron
- Location of the river mouth in Victoria
- Etymology: Greek Akheron or akhos, meaning "distress"
- Native name: Agaroon, Nyaggeron (Woiwurrung)

Location
- Country: Australia
- State: Victoria
- Region: South Eastern Highlands bioregion (IBRA), Northern Country/North Central
- Local government area: Murrindindi
- Towns: Buxton, Taggerty

Physical characteristics
- Source: Yarra Ranges, Great Dividing Range
  - location: below The Knobs
  - coordinates: 37°30′04″S 145°40′30″E
  - elevation: 637 m (2,090 ft)
- Mouth: confluence with the Goulburn River
  - location: at Acheron near Alexandra
  - coordinates: 37°14′39″S 145°42′24″E
  - elevation: 190 m (620 ft)
- Length: 84 km (52 mi)

Basin features
- River system: Goulburn Broken catchment, Murray-Darling basin
- Tributaries
  - left: Robbie Creek, Mill Creek (Victoria), Health Creek, Connelly Creek (Victoria)
  - right: Dip Creek, Little Steavenson River, Steavenson River, Cerberus Creek, Little River (Cathedral Range)
- National park: Yarra Ranges National Park

The Acheron River, a minor inland perennial river of the Goulburn Broken catchment, part of the Murray-Darling basin, is located in the lower South Eastern Highlands bioregion and Northern Country/North Central regions of the Australian state of Victoria. The headwaters of the Acheron River rise on the north–western slopes of the Yarra Ranges, below The Knobs and descend to flow into the Goulburn River near Alexandra.

== Location and features ==
The river rises below The Knobs on the north–western slopes of the Yarra Ranges, part of the Great Dividing Range, within the Yarra Ranges National Park. The flows generally north by west, much of its course following the path of the Acheron Way, through rugged national park as the river descends, then north, joined by nine tributaries including the Steavenson, Little Steavenson, and Little Rivers, before reaching its confluence with the Goulburn River at the settlement of Acheron, south of the town of Alexandra. The river descends 447 metres (1,467 ft) over its 84-kilometre (52 mi) course.

The river is crossed by the Maroondah Highway north of the locale of St Fillans, and again at the settlement of Taggerty.

== Etymology ==
In Australian Aboriginal languages, the river is variously named Agaroon, Nyaggeron, Ngaragon, and Niagaroon with no defined meanings for each of the words.

The origin of the river's current name is thought to be derived from the Latin spelling of Greek Akheron or "River of Woe", from akhos, meaning "distress". The Acheron was one of the rivers of the underworld or Kingdom of Hades, and also the name of a river in Epirus, Greece.

== See also ==
- List of rivers of Australia § Victoria
