= Acheron, Victoria =

Acheron
- Town
- Coordinates: 37°15′S 145°42′E
- Country: Australia
- State: Victoria
- Region: Hume
- LGA: Shire of Murrindindi
- Location: 114 km (71 mi) N of Melbourne; 76 km (47 mi) SE of Seymour; 34 km (21 mi) N of Marysville; 12 km (7.5 mi) S of Alexandra

Government
  - State electorate: Eildon
  - Federal division: Indi

Population
  - Total: 146 (2021 census)
- Postcode: 3714

Acheron is a locality in Victoria, Australia. At the 2021 census, Acheron had a population of 146.

== Overview ==
The locality is located along the Maroondah Highway, near the junction of Acheron River and Goulburn River.

== History ==
It was initially known as Acheron Lower, with Acheron Upper being what is now known as Taggerty. Both locality developed following the discovery of gold in Acheron River in 1870.

Acheron Post Office opened on 15 April 1876 and was renamed Taggerty in 1893. Acheron Lower Post Office opened in 1884, was renamed Acheron in 1894 and closed in 1974.

The locality was affected by the Black Friday bushfires of 1939. Seven people died near the locality while fleeing the fires.

== Sport and recreation ==
Acheron Valley Football Club won the 1947 Upper Goulburn Football League premiership win against Thornton

Famous Australian sprint runner and Footscray player, Eric Cumming lived in Acheron on his family's farm.
