= Steavenson River =

Steavenson Steavensons, Stevenson
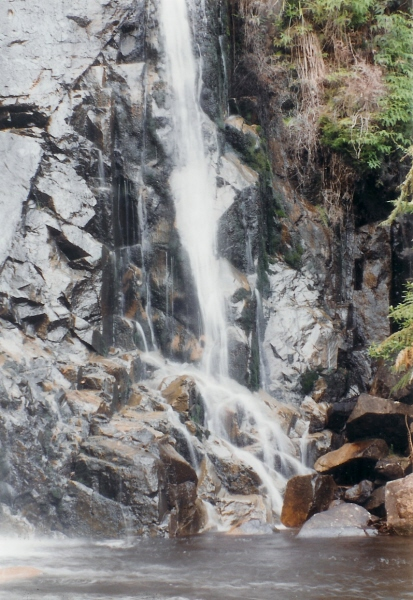
- One of the five drops of the Steavenson Falls situated on the Steavenson River

- Location of the Steavenson River mouth in Victoria
- Native name: Nur-ro-nur-ro (disputed)

Location
- Country: Australia
- State: Victoria
- Region: South Eastern Highlands bioregion (IBRA), Northern Country/North Central
- Local government area: Murrindindi
- Towns: Marysville, Buxton

Physical characteristics
- Source: Yarra Ranges, Great Dividing Range
  - location: below Mount Edgar
  - coordinates: 37°32′40″S 145°47′10″E
  - elevation: 813 m (2,667 ft)
- Mouth: confluence with the Acheron River
  - location: near Buxton
  - coordinates: 37°24′58″S 145°41′55″E
  - elevation: 264 m (866 ft)
- Length: 20 km (12 mi)

Basin features
- River system: Goulburn Broken catchment, Murray-Darling basin
- Tributaries
  - left: Wilks Creek
  - right: Taggerty River, Keppel Creek
- National park: Yarra Ranges National Park

The Steavenson River, sometimes incorrectly referred to as Steavensons River, a minor inland perennial river of the Goulburn Broken catchment, part of the Murray-Darling basin, is located in the lower South Eastern Highlands bioregion and Northern Country/North Central regions of the Australian state of Victoria. The headwaters of the Steavenson River rise on the north–western slopes of the Yarra Ranges, below Mount Edgar and descend to flow into the Acheron River near Buxton.

== Location and features ==
The river rises below Mount Edgar on the north–western slopes of the Yarra Ranges, part of the Great Dividing Range, within the Yarra Ranges National Park. The flows generally north by west, through rugged national park as the river descends, then north, joined by three tributaries including the Taggerty River, before reaching its confluence with the Acheron River near the settlement of Buxton. The river descends 549 metres (1,801 ft) over its 20-kilometre (12 mi) course.

The river is crossed by the Maroondah Highway south of Buxton. An anabranch of the river, called Little Steavenson River, splits from the main river and reaches its confluence with the Acheron River, also near the settlement of Buxton.

Steavenson Falls, a 122-metre (400 ft) horsetail waterfall located in the upper reaches of the river, descends over five drops, the last having a clear drop of more than 21 metres (69 ft) and is situated approximately 3.4 kilometres (2.1 mi) east of Marysville.

Much of the catchment area of the river was destroyed by the Black Saturday bushfires that passed through the area on 7 February 2009, destroying almost all of the man made infrastructure and causing extensive damage to the forest in the area.

== Etymology ==
In an Australian Aboriginal language, the river is claimed to be named Nur-ro-nur-ro, with no defined meaning for the name. That claim is disputed.

It is believed that the lower reaches of the Steavenson River, from the confluence of the Taggerty River with the Steavenson River, at the locale of Vic Oak, until the river mouth near Buxton, may have been initially named as the Taggerty River, until the Steavenson was officially named.

== See also ==
- List of rivers of Australia § Victoria
