= Narrow-leaved peppermint =

Narrow-leaved peppermint or narrow-leafed peppermint is a common name for several plants and may refer to:

- Eucalyptus australis, endemic to Western Australia
- Eucalyptus nicholii, native to northern New South Wales
- Eucalyptus radiata, native to eastern Australia
