= Cathedral Range (Victoria) =

Mountain range in Victoria, Australia

Cathedral Range (Nanadhong)
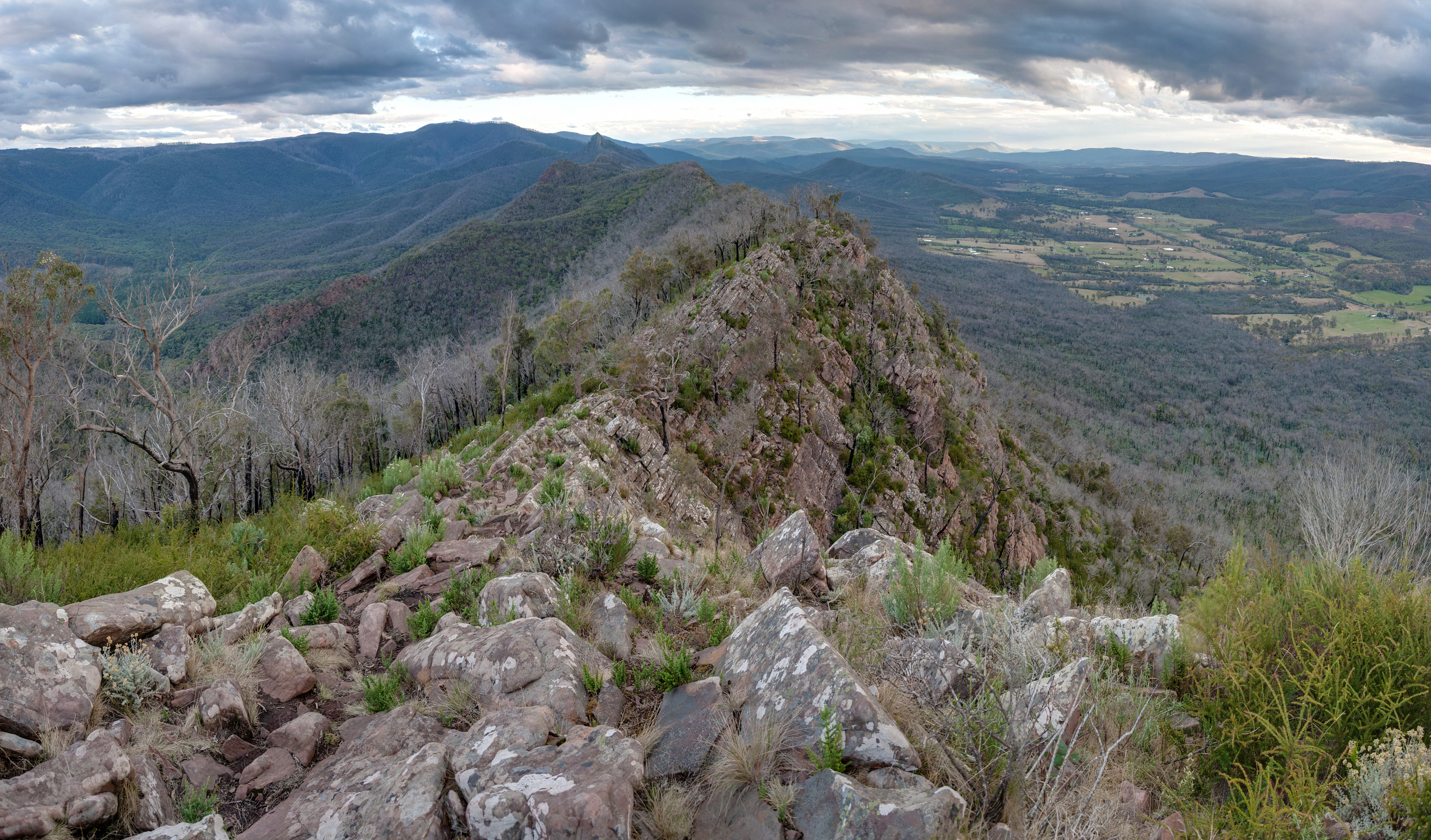
- A panoramic view of the Cathedral Range ridge from Cathedral Peak, looking south towards the Jawbones and Sugarloaf Peak

Highest point
- Peak: The Green Hill
- Elevation: 1,241 m (4,072 ft); AHD
- Coordinates: 37°25′40″S 145°47′09″E

Geography
- Location within Victoria
- Country: Australia
- Region: Victoria
- Range coordinates: 37°22′16″S 145°45′11″E
- Parent range: Great Dividing Range

Geology
- Rock age: Devonian Period
- Rock types: Sedimentary, sandstone and mudstone

The Cathedral Range (Taungurung: Nanadhong) is a mountain range that is part of the Great Dividing Range in Victoria, Australia, located in Cathedral Range State Park. The range is formed from a 7-kilometre (4.3 mi) ridge of upturned sedimentary rock, consisting mainly of sandstone, mudstone and conglomerates of the Devonian Period. This has given the range steep sides, and a narrow razorback ridge. The higher plateau on the eastern boundary of the park includes the nearby Lake Mountain cross country ski area. Much of the park and adjoining forests stills shows the damage from the Black Saturday bushfires in 2009.

The Taungurung name for the area encompassing the Cathedral Range State Park is Nanadhong.

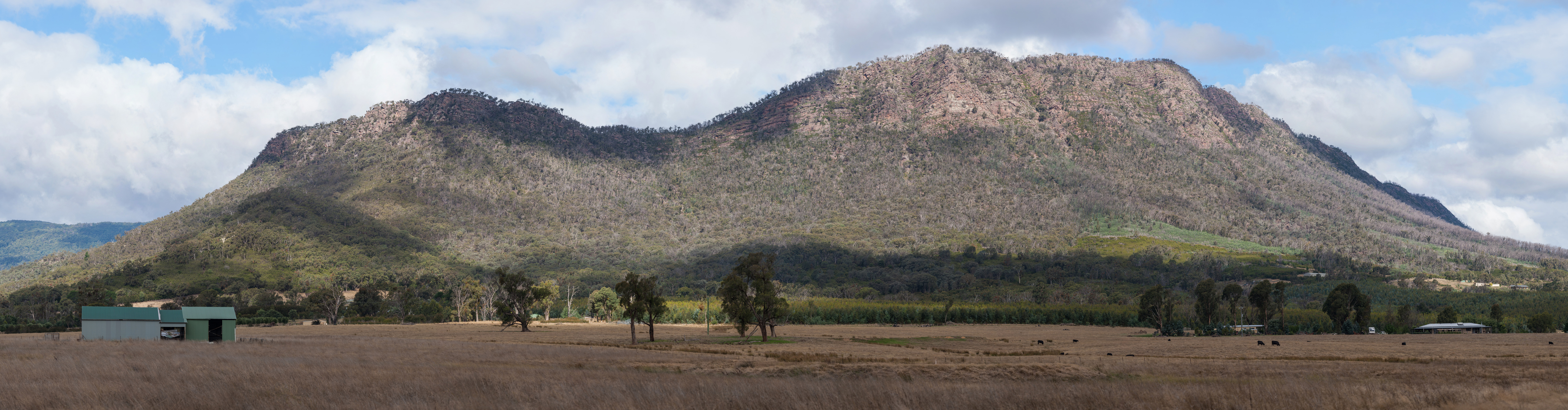
The northern section of the Cathedral Range as viewed from the west on Maroondah Highway

== See also ==
- List of mountains in Australia § Victoria
