= Steavenson Falls =

Coordinates: 37.5327°S 145.7737°E

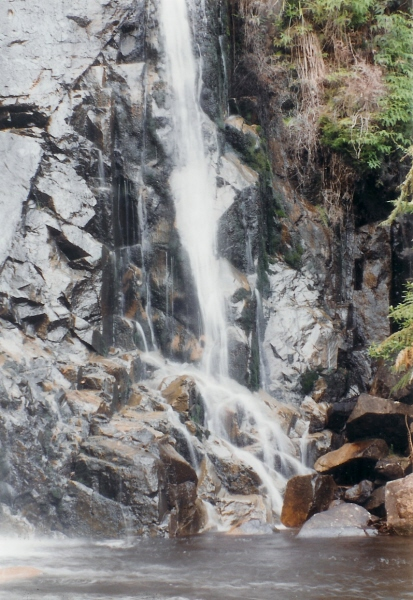
- Steavenson Falls
- Interactive map of Steavenson Falls
- Location: Australia
- Type: Horsetail
- Total height: 122 metres (400 ft)
- Number of drops: 5
- Longest drop: 21 metres (69 ft)

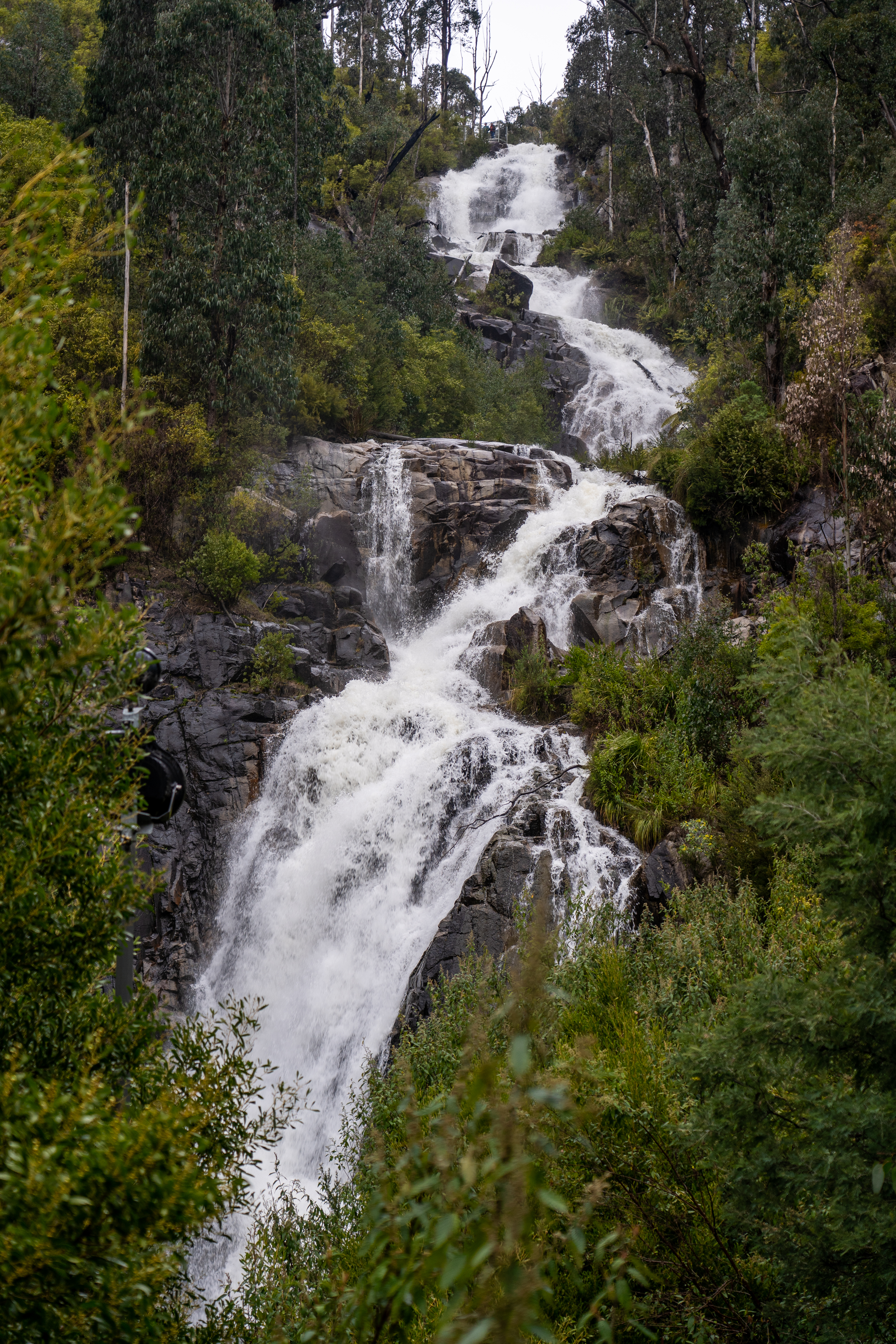
The upper cascades of the falls

Steavenson Falls is a waterfall on the Steavenson River, 4 kilometres (2.5 mi) southeast of Marysville, Victoria, Australia. The falls are one of the tallest in Victoria, with five cascades, a total descent of 122 metres (400 ft), the last having a clear drop of more than 21 metres (69 ft).

== History ==
Residents cut a track to the falls in 1866. The falls and the river were named after John Steavenson (Assistant Commissioner of Roads and Bridges), who first visited the site of what is now Marysville in 1862. He was carrying out a survey of the area to try to find a new alignment for the road to the gold fields at Woods Point.

The 190 hectares (470 acres) Steavenson Falls Scenic Reserve was proclaimed in 1959 to protect the falls and their surroundings. The Reserve is jointly administered by the Department of Primary Industry and a Voluntary Committee of Management.

== The reserve ==
There are a number of walks in the reserve varying from easy to the more difficult.

A turbine driven by water drawn from the weir at the base of the falls generates power for the floodlights and the lights along the paths. Funding for these works was obtained by the local Tourist Association from the old Tourism Victoria. The floodlighting was formally turned on by the Minister for Tourism, Murray Byrne, on 3 November 1972. Marysville's water supply also comes from this weir.

Dense forest covers the entire Steavenson Falls Reserve in the steep-sided valley. Pure stands of mountain ash which regenerated after the 1939 bushfires grow in sheltered places.

Elsewhere the forest contains a mixture of eucalyptus species, notably mountain grey gum, messmate and narrow-leafed peppermint. Other trees growing in association with the eucalyptus include myrtle beech which has small, shiny, dark green leaves and is restricted to areas of high rainfall, blackwood, one of the wattles, a tall tree with masses of pale yellow flowers, and silver wattle.

The sheltered river margins support soft and rough tree-ferns, their height bearing testimony to their considerable age.

Lyrebirds are often seen in the morning and after rain searching for insects and worms. It is easy to see where they have been by the prominent scratch marks in the leaves and twigs on the ground.

Steavenson Falls is a major tourist attraction with some 180,000 visitors a year.

== Bushfire damage ==
A major bushfire passed through the area on 7 February 2009, destroying almost all of the man made infrastructure and causing extensive damage to the forest in the area. The only recoverable piece of infrastructure was the hydro-electric generator which had been used to light the falls at night. After the fire major works were undertaken to restore the road and visitor facilities and to remove dead trees because of the danger they presented. Extensive natural regeneration of the native forest has also occurred. The area is regrowing nicely as seen in this video but there is still lots to remind us of the intensity of the fires.

== See also ==
- List of waterfalls
- List of waterfalls in Australia
