= Lake Mountain (Victoria) =

Mountain in Victoria, Australia

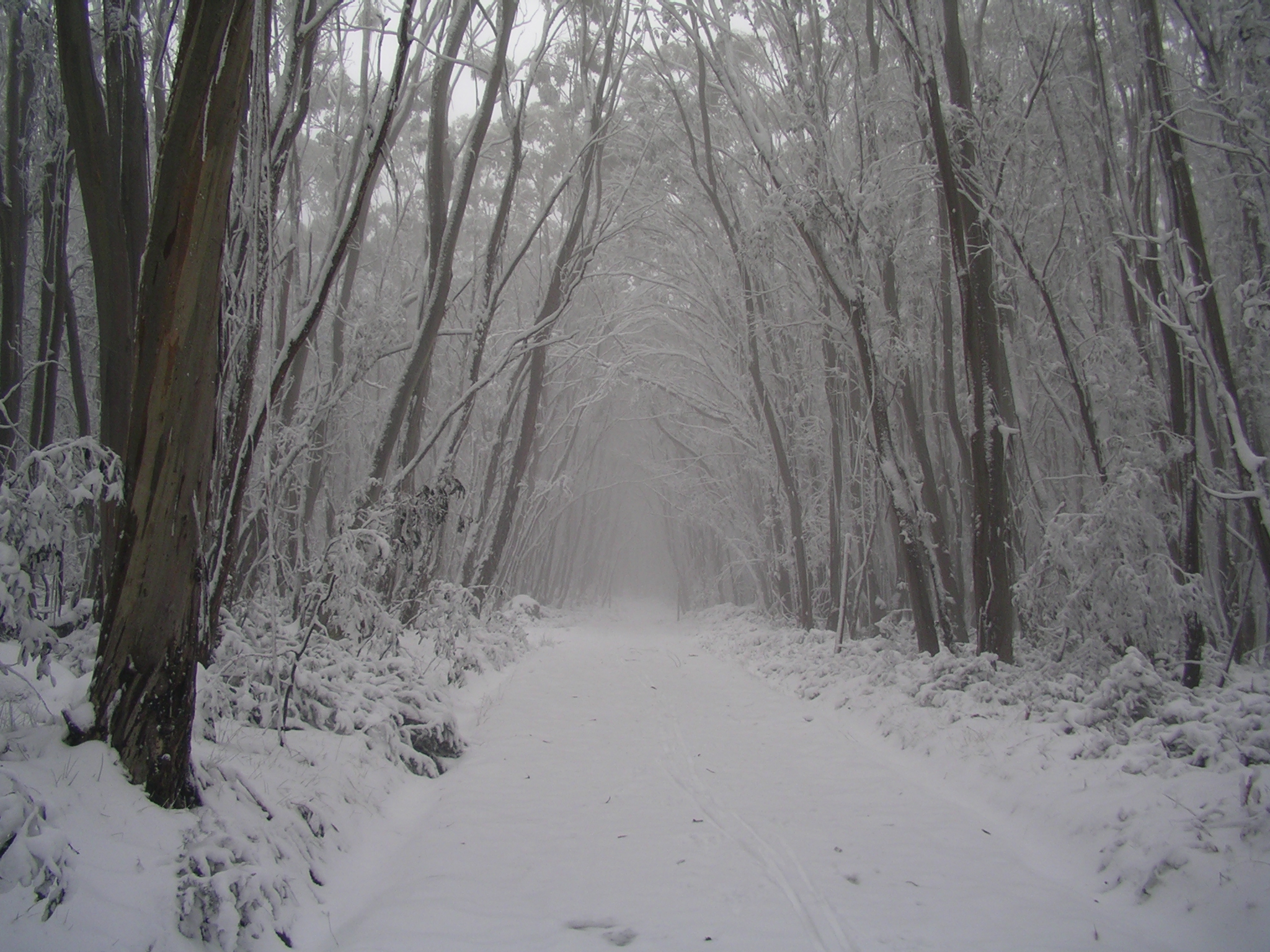
- A ski trail at Lake Mountain following a snowfall

Highest point
- Elevation: 1,433 m (4,701 ft)
- Coordinates: 37°30′16″S 145°52′56″E

Geography
- Location within Shire of Murrindindi
- Location: Victoria, Australia
- Parent range: Cathedral Range, Great Dividing Range

Climbing
- First ascent: unknown
- Easiest route: Short hike from carpark

Lake Mountain Alpine Resort
- Interactive map of Lake Mountain Alpine Resort
- Location: Lake Mountain
- Nearest city: Melbourne, Victoria
- Coordinates: 37°31′01″S 145°52′51″E
- Vertical: 150 metres (490 ft)
- Top elevation: 1,480 metres (4,860 ft)
- Base elevation: 1,330 metres (4,360 ft)
- Website: www.lakemountainresort.com.au

Lake Mountain is a 1,433-metre-high (4,701 ft) mountain peak on a plateau that hosts a cross-country ski resort that is known by the same name. It is located in Victoria, Australia, approximately 120 kilometres (75 mi) north-east of Melbourne. The 1,483-metre-high (4,865 ft) Mount Bullfight, which is within the Mount Bullfight Nature Conservation Reserve, is the highest peak that can be reached by a cross-country ski trail from Lake Mountain. Access to Lake Mountain's summit is restricted to a snow shoe track in winter. The Lake Mountain Alpine Resort, located near Lake Mountain, is the most popular ski resort in Australia when measured in terms of total visitor numbers, including sightseers, due to its proximity to Melbourne.

The Lake Mountain Alpine Resort is surrounded by the Yarra Ranges National Park into which its ski trails lead. The resort is an unincorporated area under the direct administration of the government of Victoria, and is surrounded to the west, north and east by the Shire of Murrindindi and Yarra Ranges Shire to the south.

There is no lake at Lake Mountain. It is claimed that the mountain was named after George Lake, who was the surveyor-general of the area. Contradicting this, VICNames says that it is named for the "tarns, ponds and bogs near the summit". These features are on Echo Flat, 2 kilometres (1.2 mi) from the summit.

== Location and features ==
The Lake Mountain Alpine Resort is situated in a saddle between Lake Mountain and Echo Flat and provides access to a 37-kilometre (23 mi) ski trail network through the surrounding Yarra Ranges National Park. It is an exclusively cross-country skiing resort. It is especially popular with families, with the majority (80%) of the visitors to the resort throughout the year being a family demographic. Many go to the resort not to ski but for sightseeing and snow play; there are up to seven toboggan runs though only the two main runs are open to the general public. The first and most popular is directly adjacent to the Lake Mountain Alpine Resort Day Visitor Centre, while the second branches off of the first for a longer and somewhat steeper slope. Neither snowboarding nor walking are allowed on the ski trails during the winter season.

The alpine centre was opened on 12 June 2004 at a cost of A$3.7 million along with the refurbishment and restructuring of two other buildings, a toilet block and visitor's locker room area, and the Ski Patroller's Centre, the main area for the coordination and first aid treatments employed by the ski patrollers. It has several other facilities, such as two fully equipped conference centres and a licensed café bar. The Heights Bar and Café remains open all year round, to accommodate bushwalkers and bike riders.

In 2005, the Ski Patroller's Centre was equipped to operate as "Snow Gum Lodge" during the off-season, generally available between November and May, for secluded and private overnight stays. It was the only accommodation on-mountain but was destroyed in the 2009 bushfires.

=== Impact of 2009 bushfires ===
The bushfires on 7 February 2009 caused considerable damage at Lake Mountain. Much of the forested area was burnt, and almost all buildings except the main Day Visitor Centre/Ski Hire/Bistro were destroyed. Extensive work was undertaken to enable the resort to open for 2009 winter season. Temporary buildings were delivered to serve as toilets, ski patrol centre, and kiosk. Damaged wooden trail features and bridges were rebuilt.

=== Road cycling ===
Lake Mountain is a popular destination for road cyclists due to the challenging climbs up to the resort. Lake Mountain can be climbed from two sides: from Warburton (a 40-kilometre (25 mi) climb up the Reefton Spur) or from Marysville, the more popular route. The climb from Marysville is 21.3 kilometres (13.2 mi) long and rises at an average gradient of 4.3%. The first 4.3 kilometres (2.7 mi) of the climb are the most challenging, with an average gradient of 8.1%.

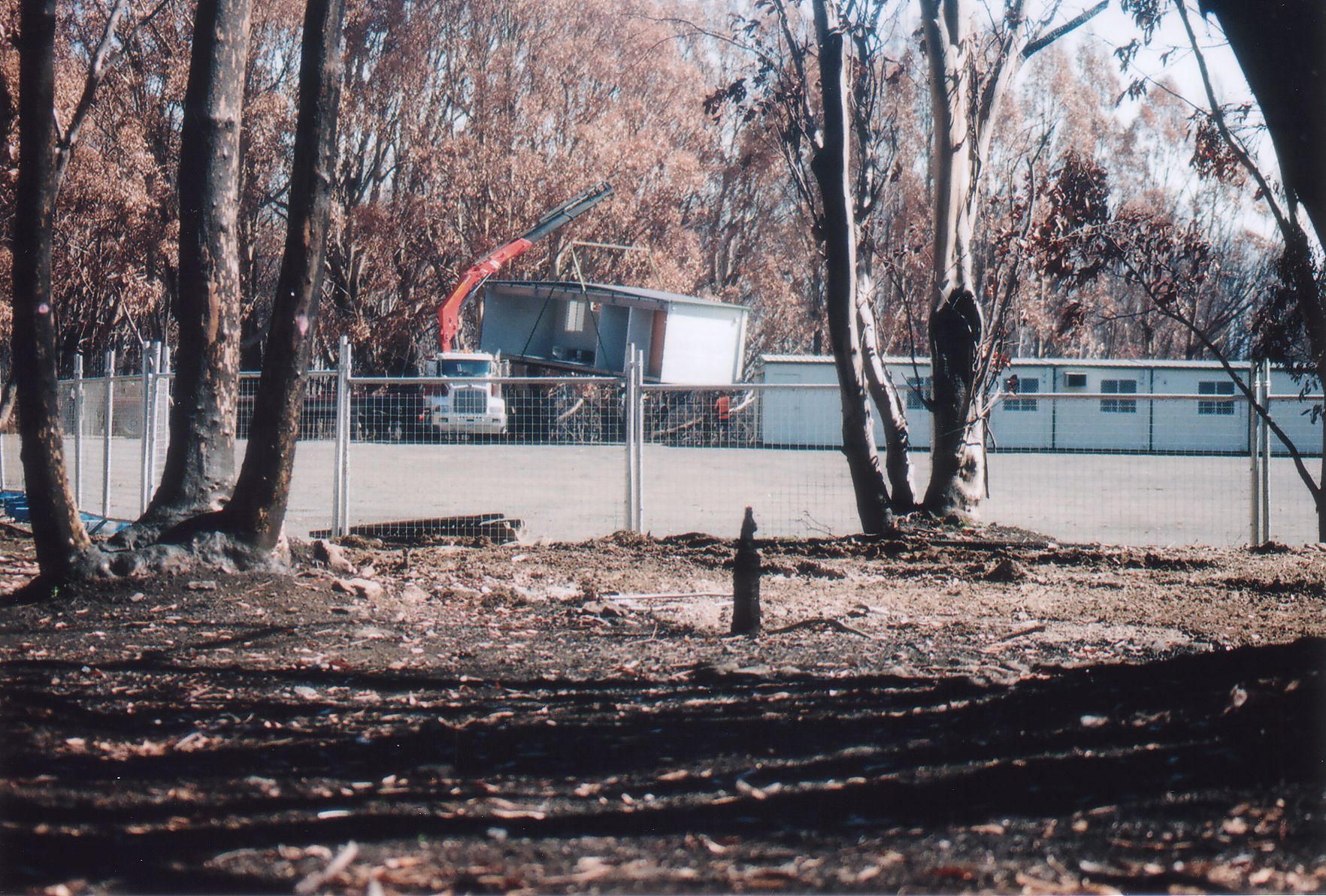
Portable buildings set up at Lake Mountain after the Black Saturday bushfires

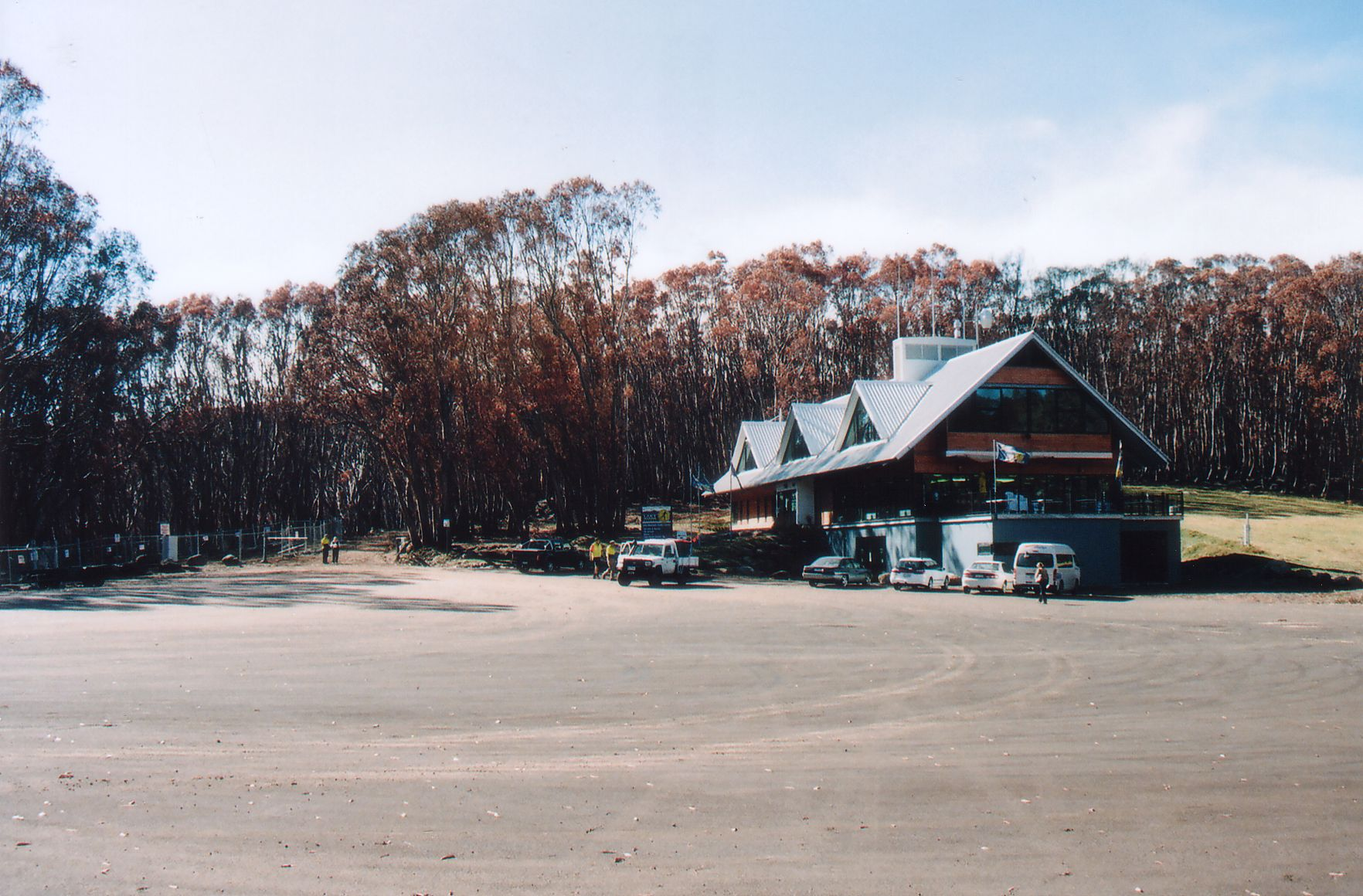
Main visitor centre - the only remaining building after the fires

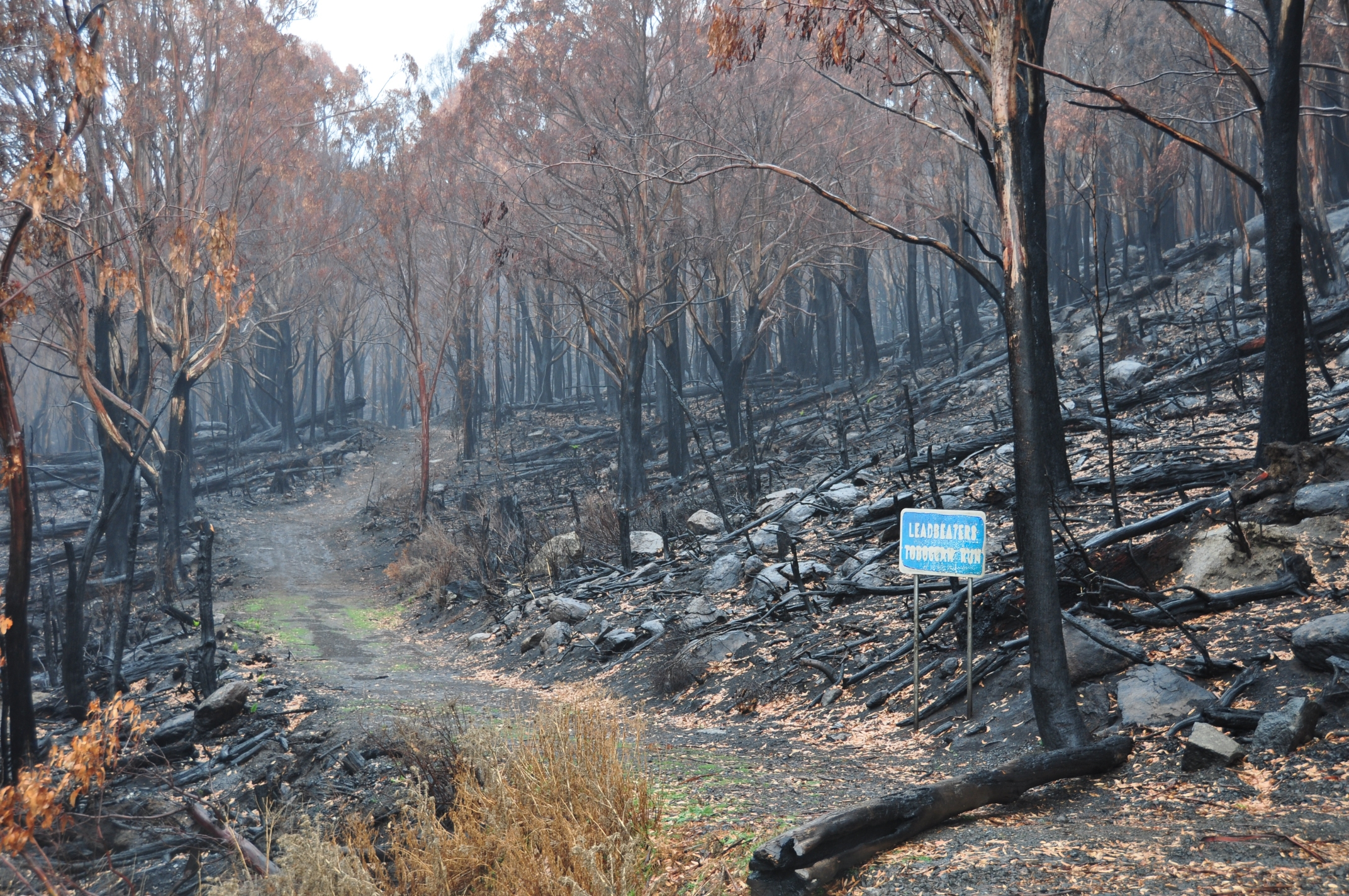
Lake Mountain toboggan run burnt

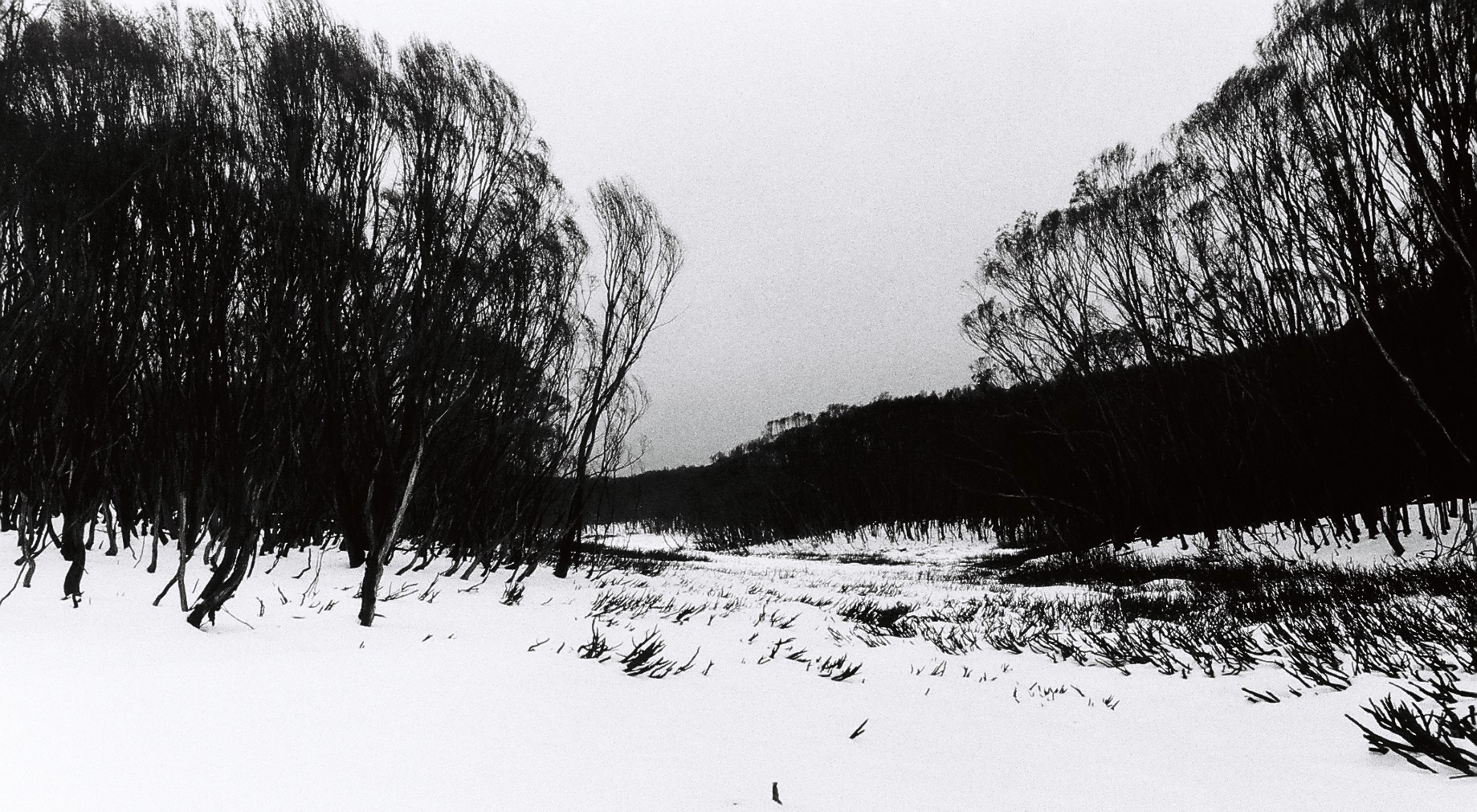
The burnt trees, somewhere up on the Cross-Country trail

== See also ==
- Alpine National Park
- List of mountains in Australia § Victoria
- Mount Torbreck
- Skiing in Australia
