= Taggerty =

- Town
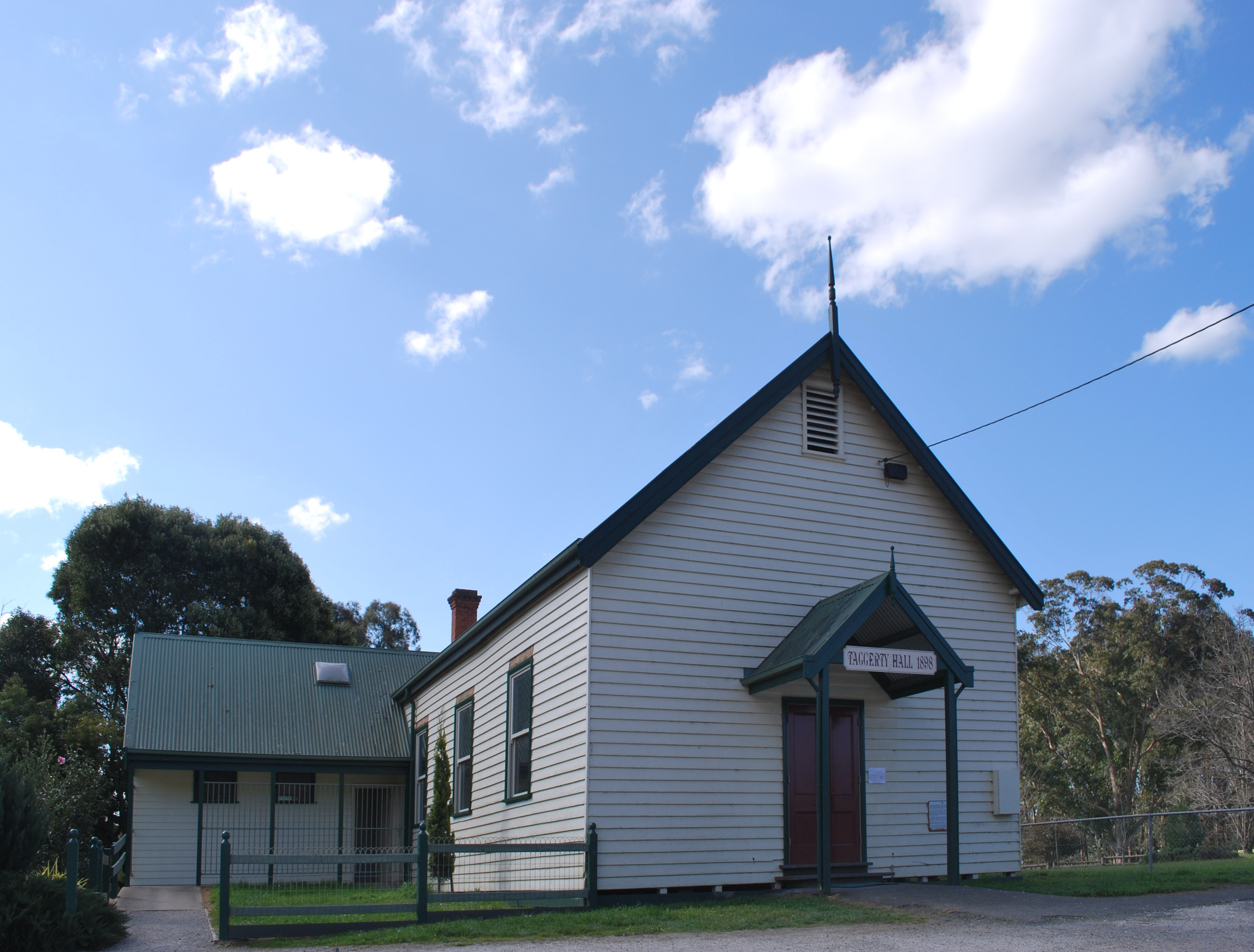
- Public hall

- Interactive map of Taggerty
- Coordinates: 37°19′18″S 145°42′43″E
- Country: Australia
- State: Victoria
- Region: Hume
- LGA: Shire of Murrindindi
- Location: 108 km (67 mi) NE of Melbourne; 52 km (32 mi) NE of Kinglake; 18 km (11 mi) S of Alexandra

Government
  - State electorate: Eildon
  - Federal division: Indi

Population
  - Total: 405 (2021 census)
- Postcode: 3714

Taggerty is a town in central Victoria, Australia. It is located at the intersection of Maroondah Highway and Thornton Road. The Acheron River also crosses the highway at Taggerty. At the 2021 census, Taggerty had a population of 405.

A pastoral run called Taggerty Run was established in 1846. The homestead of the run was called Taggerty House. Gold was discovered along the Acheron River in 1870, which led to the establishment of two settlements, named Acheron Lower (now known as Acheron) and Acheron Upper (now known as Taggerty). The Post Office opened on 15 April 1876 and was renamed Taggerty in 1893. Acheron Upper Primary School opened in 1875. The general store opened in 1891, as did a butter factory, reflecting the area's shift from gold mining towards dairy farming. The town was given the name Taggerty in 1890 to avoid confusion with Acheron Lower.

Today Taggerty remains a small township, with a general store, primary school (closed 2017), a town hall, a caravan park, and several bed and breakfasts.
