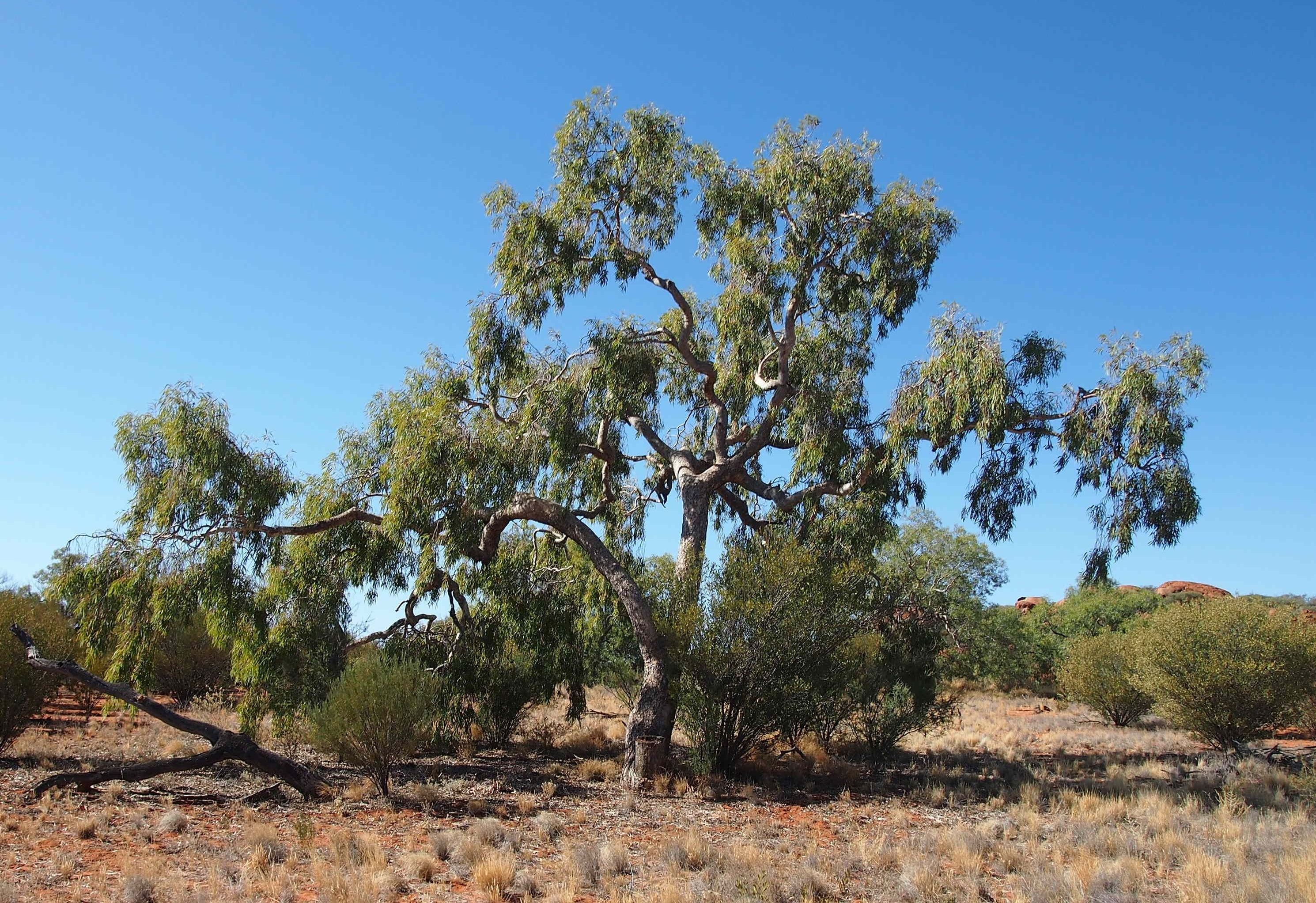
- Corymbia eremaea habit

Scientific classification
- Kingdom: Plantae
- Clade: Tracheophytes
- Clade: Angiosperms
- Clade: Eudicots
- Clade: Rosids
- Order: Myrtales
- Family: Myrtaceae
- Genus: Corymbia
- Species: C. eremaea

Binomial name
- Corymbia eremaea (D.J.Carr & S.G.M.Carr) K.D.Hill & L.A.S.Johnson

Synonyms
- Eucalyptus aff. dichromophloia; Eucalyptus eremaea D.J.Carr & S.G.M.Carr; Eucalyptus dichromophloia auct. non F.Muell.; Eucalyptus lenziana auct. non D.J.Carr & S.G.M.Carr

= Corymbia eremaea =

Species of plant

Corymbia eremaea, commonly known as mallee bloodwood, hill bloodwood and Centre Range bloodwood, is a small, mallee-like tree that is endemic to central Australia. Indigenous Australians know the plant as muur-muurpa. It has rough, evenly tessellated bark, lance-shaped leaves, oval to pear-shaped flower buds arranged on a branching peduncle and urn-shaped fruit.

== Description ==
Corymbia eremaea is usually a small to mallee-like tree that typically grows to a height of 10 m (33 ft) and forms a lignotuber. It has rough, evenly-tessellated, brownish bark from the trunk to small branches, but sometimes only smooth bark on smaller plants. Young plants and coppice regrowth have dull green, lance-shaped leaves the same shade of green on both sides, linear to narrow lance-shaped, 20–110 mm (0.79–4.33 in) long, 7–21 mm (0.28–0.83 in) wide and arranged in more or less opposite pairs. Adult leaves are arranged alternately, the same shade of dull to slightly glossy green on both sides, narrow lance-shaped to lance-shaped, 75–120 mm (3.0–4.7 in) long and 10–21 mm (0.39–0.83 in) wide on a petiole 6–20 mm (0.24–0.79 in) long. The flower buds are arranged on the ends of branchlets on a branched peduncle 8–14 mm (0.31–0.55 in) long, each branch with seven buds on pedicels 3–8 mm (0.12–0.31 in) long. Mature buds are usually oval, 6–8 mm (0.24–0.31 in) long and 4–5 mm (0.16–0.20 in) wide with a rounded to conical operculum. Flowering mainly occurs from November to January and the flowers are white. The fruit is a woody, urn-shaped capsule 11–22 mm (0.43–0.87 in) long and 9–18 mm (0.35–0.71 in) wide with the valves deeply enclosed in the fruit. The seeds are brown with a terminal wing.

== Taxonomy ==
Mallee bloodwood was first formally described in 1985 by Denis Carr and Stella Carr from specimens collected west of Ayers Rock in 1969 by John Maconochie, and was given the name Eucalyptus eremaea. In 1995 Ken Hill and Lawrie Johnson changed the name to Corymbia eremaea in the journal Telopea. The specific epithet (eremaea) refers to the occurrence of the species in desert areas.

In the same edition of Telopea, Hill and Johnson described two subspecies of C. eremaea and the names are accepted at the Australian Plant Census:

- Corymbia eremaea (D.J.Carr & S.M.Carr) K.D.Hill & L.A.S.Johnson subsp. eremaea that has adult leaves more than 90 mm (3.5 in) long and fruits more than 11 mm (0.43 in) diameter;
- Corymbia eremaea subsp. oligocarpa (Blakely & Jacobs) K.D.Hill & L.A.S.Johnson, (previously Eucalyptus polycarpa var. oligocarpa Blakely & Jacobs) that has adult leaves less than 90 mm (3.5 in) long and fruits less than 11 mm (0.43 in) diameter.

== Distribution ==
Corymbea eremaea grows on stony hills, rocky slopes and the foot of rocky hills. Both subspecies are widespread and common in arid areas of central Australia, including the southern part of the Northern Territory as far east as the Simpson Desert, the north-western corner of South Australia and the Central Ranges of Western Australia.

== Conservation status ==
Both subspecies of C. eremaea are listed as "not threatened" by the Western Australian Government Department of Parks and Wildlife and as of "least concern" under the Northern Territory Territory Parks and Wildlife Conservation Act 1976.

== See also ==
- List of Corymbia species
