= Cathedral Range State Park =

Protected area in Victoria, Australia

- IUCN category II (national park)
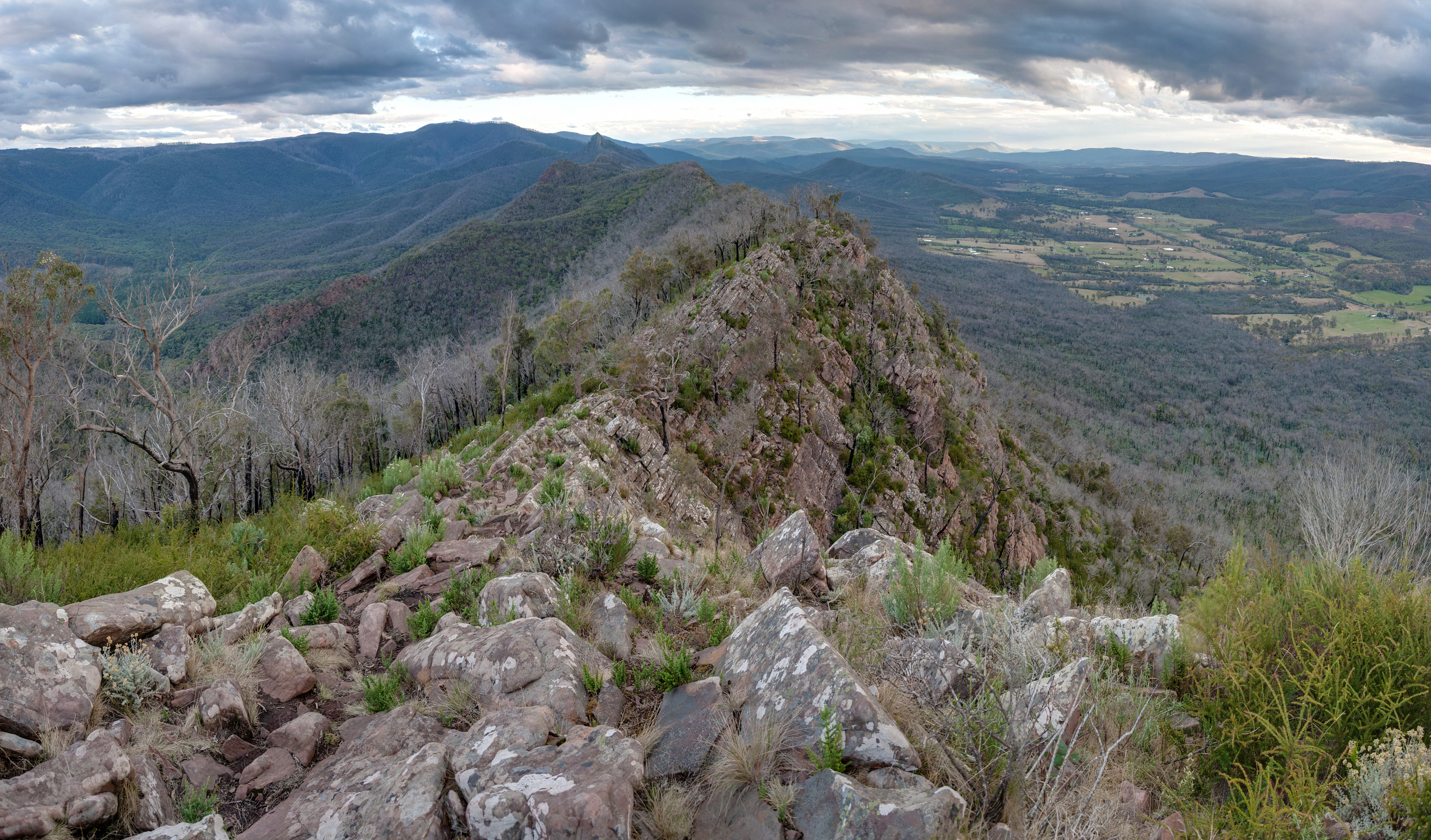
- The ridge of the Cathedral Range looking south

- Location within Victoria
- Location: Victoria
- Nearest city: Buxton
- Coordinates: 37°22′49″S 145°44′09″E
- Area: 3,577 ha (13.81 sq mi)
- Governing body: Parks Victoria
- Website: https://www.parks.vic.gov.au/places-to-see/parks/cathedral-range-state-park

The Cathedral Range State Park (Taungurung: Nanadhong) located in Victoria, Australia, approximately 100 kilometres (62 mi) north-east of Melbourne. It is situated between the towns of Buxton and Taggerty and runs parallel to the Maroondah Highway. The Cathedral Range was declared a State Park on 26 April 1979. It consists of 3,577 hectares and contains the rugged Razorback and spectacular peaks of the Cathedral Range, Little River and forested hills of the Blue Range. Due to its proximity to Melbourne the Cathedral Ranges are a popular destination for both day and weekend adventures. Bushwalking, camping, rock climbing and abseiling are some of the more popular activities available. Cathedral Range State Park is listed as Category II under the IUCN World Commission on Protected Areas and is an example of a park that can be used for recreation, education and conserving natural ecosystems.

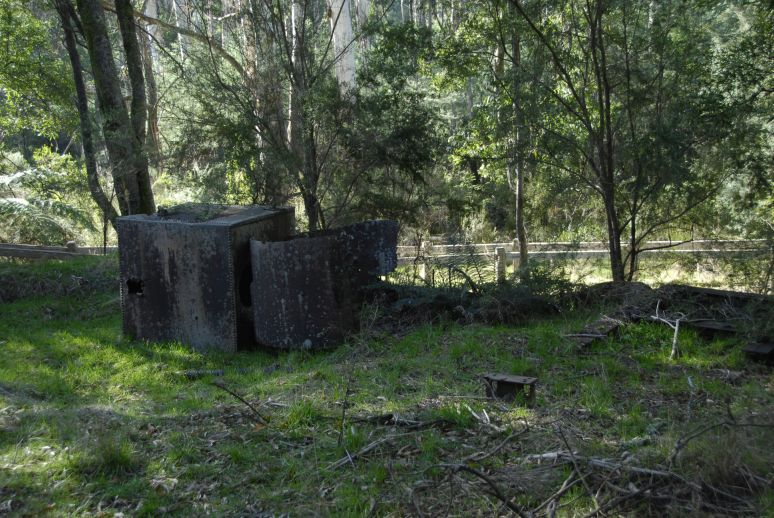
Cooks Mill Historic Site

== History ==
European settlement of the Acheron area begun in 1839 when they selected land for the Acheron Run. The Taggerty Run was selected for 7 years after the Acheron Run in 1846. This area included the Cathedral Range area. The Taggerty Run consisted of difficult country and was described as being "completely in the ranges". This difficult country of rocky soils and steep slopes discouraged the settlers from building there, so instead the land was grazed until the 1930s when wild dogs became destructive. Soon after grazing in the Cathedral Range area ended, logging and milling occurred in the 1930s to the 1970s in the Little River and Storm Creek catchments. In 1938 the Cathedral Mill, now known as Cooks Mill, was established near the junction of Little River and Storm Creek. The mill ceased operating in 1955, however logging continued until late 1971. Remnants of Cooks Mill remain at the Cathedral Range State Park and is protected as a historic site.

== Aboriginal heritage ==
The traditional land owners of the Murrindindi Shire, including the Cathedral Range, are the Taungurung people. An important area for members of the Taungurung people is located in the Acheron River valley, located to the west of the Cathedral Range State Park. Aboriginal Affairs Victoria have recorded two sites, one containing a scarred tree and the other an isolated artefact, in the Cathedral Range State Park.

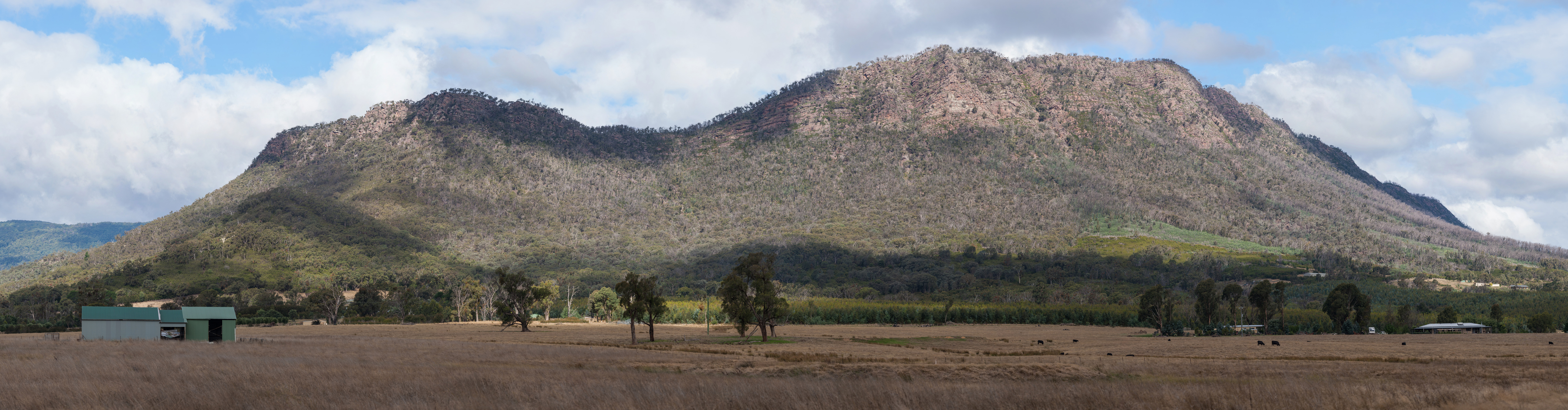
Cathedral Range Northern Section, Victoria – March 2012

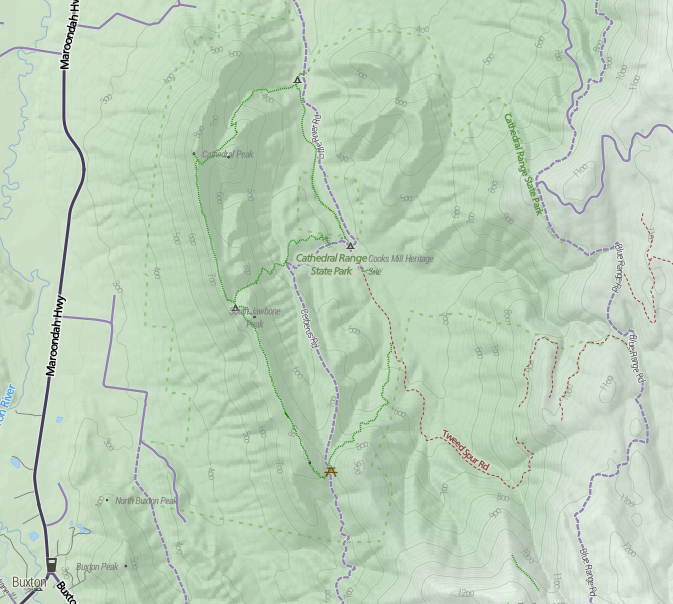
Topographic map of the park

== Geology and land features ==
The Cathedral Ranges consist of sandstone and shale that were laid down over 400 million years ago during the Upper Silurian period. These have since eroded into the spectacular peaks of the Cathedral Ranges. The range is approximately 7 km long and 1.5 km wide. The highest peak is Sugarloaf Peak which stands at 923m, located at the southern end of the range. At the opposite end of the range stands the second highest peak at 814m, known as the Cathedral North Peak. These peaks are separated by a narrow saddle, referred to as the Jawbone saddle. The eastern side of the State Park borders onto the Cerberean Caldera, formed by a volcanic eruption approximately 374 million years ago. Consequently, the geology of the area consists of sedimentary and volcanic formations originating in the Upper Devonian Period. The soils are mostly red clays that are resistant to erosion.

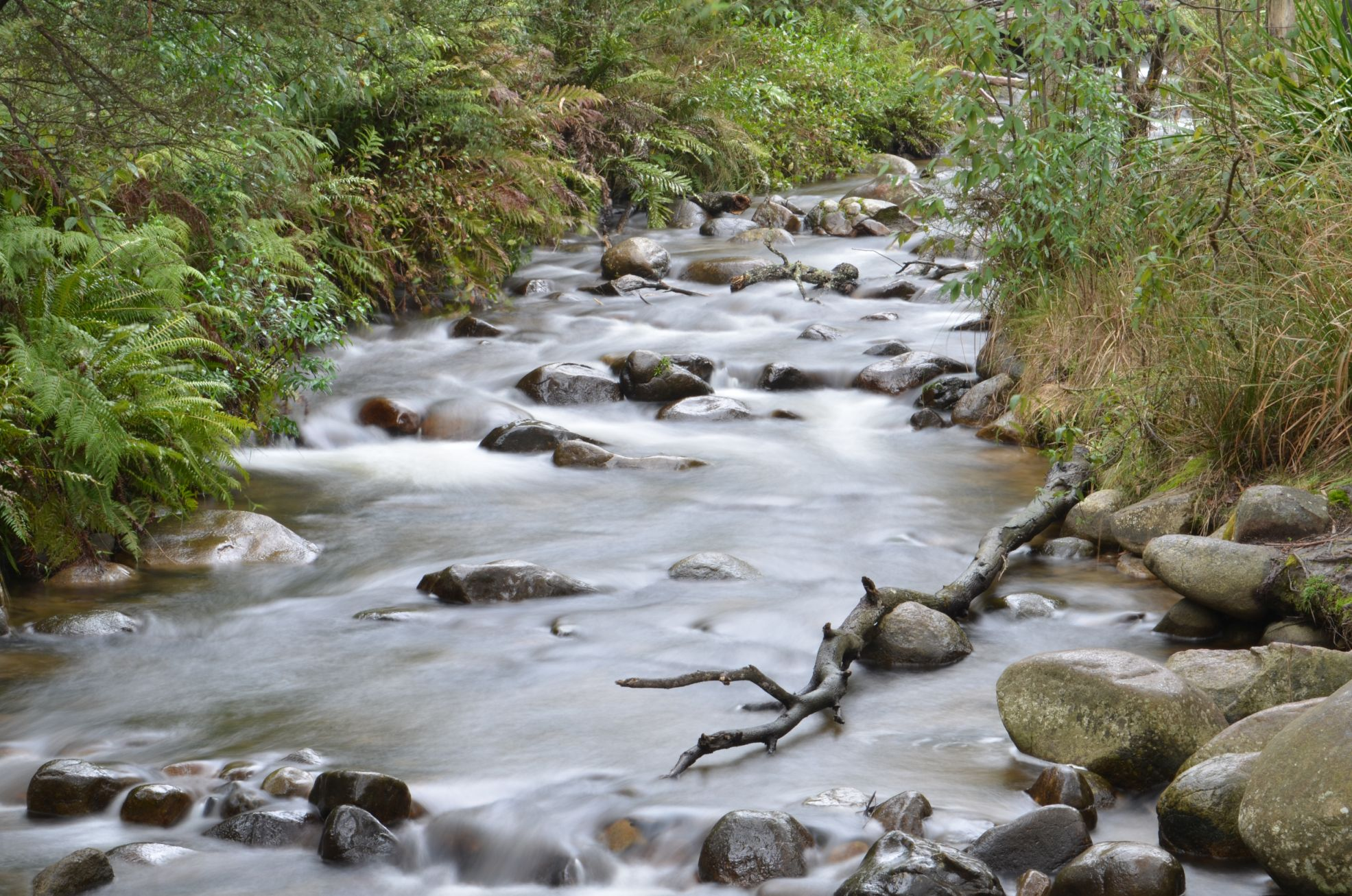
Little River at Cathedral Range

== Rivers ==
There are two permanent rivers in Cathedral Range State Park; Little River and Storm Creek. Little River flows north-west and merges with the Acheron River in Taggerty. The township of Taggerty receives their water directly from Little River. The river runs through the camping and picnic sites in the park, providing the potential of pollution to the river. Storm Creek intercepts with Little River near Cooks Mill, located in the Cathedral Range State Park. The water levels of the rivers can get high after heavy rainfall, with flooding being a common occurrence. The last significant flooding occurring in 1996 when extensive damage occurred on Little River Road.

== Biodiversity ==
The Cathedral Range State Park is home to a large number of species. The existence of some communities has been recognized as being significant in the State Park, as well as the occurrence of some rare species.

=== Flora ===
The park contains a broad range of vegetation communities, with the Ecological Vegetation Classes of the area including herb-rich foothill forest, grassy dry forest, damp forest and riparian forest. The vegetation ranges from Manna Gum Tall Open Forest found along the banks of Little River to myrtle beech Closed Forest found above 900 m. The dry rocky slopes are covered with open forest, with the main species being red stringybark (Eucalyptus macrorhyncha), broad-leaved peppermint (Eucalyptus dives) and long-leaved box (Eucalyptus goniocalyx). The moist river valleys contain candlebark gum (Eucalyptus rubida) and narrow-leaved peppermint (Eucalyptus radiata). The summit of Sugarloaf Peak contains a community of snow gum (Eucalyptus pauciflora) and just below this is a community of alpine ash (Eucalyptus delegatensis) extending down to the Sugarloaf Saddle.

A community noted to be significant found in the State Park is the existence of myrtle beech (Nothofagus cunninghamii) with the woolly tea-tree (Leptospermum lanigerum). This community is marked as significant as it is known to occur in only one other location—Baw Baw National Park.

The park is home to a variety of native orchids, appearing in spring and summer each year. These orchids are the alpine greenhood (Pterostylis alpina), pink fingers (Caladenia carnea), waxlips (Glossodia major), and the bird orchid.

The Cathedral Range State Park is also home to some rare species: The bristle-fern (Cephalomanes caudatum) which is considered rare in Victoria, slender tick-trefoil (Desmodium varians) which is poorly known in Victoria and a range of common tussock-grasses considered rare in Victoria.

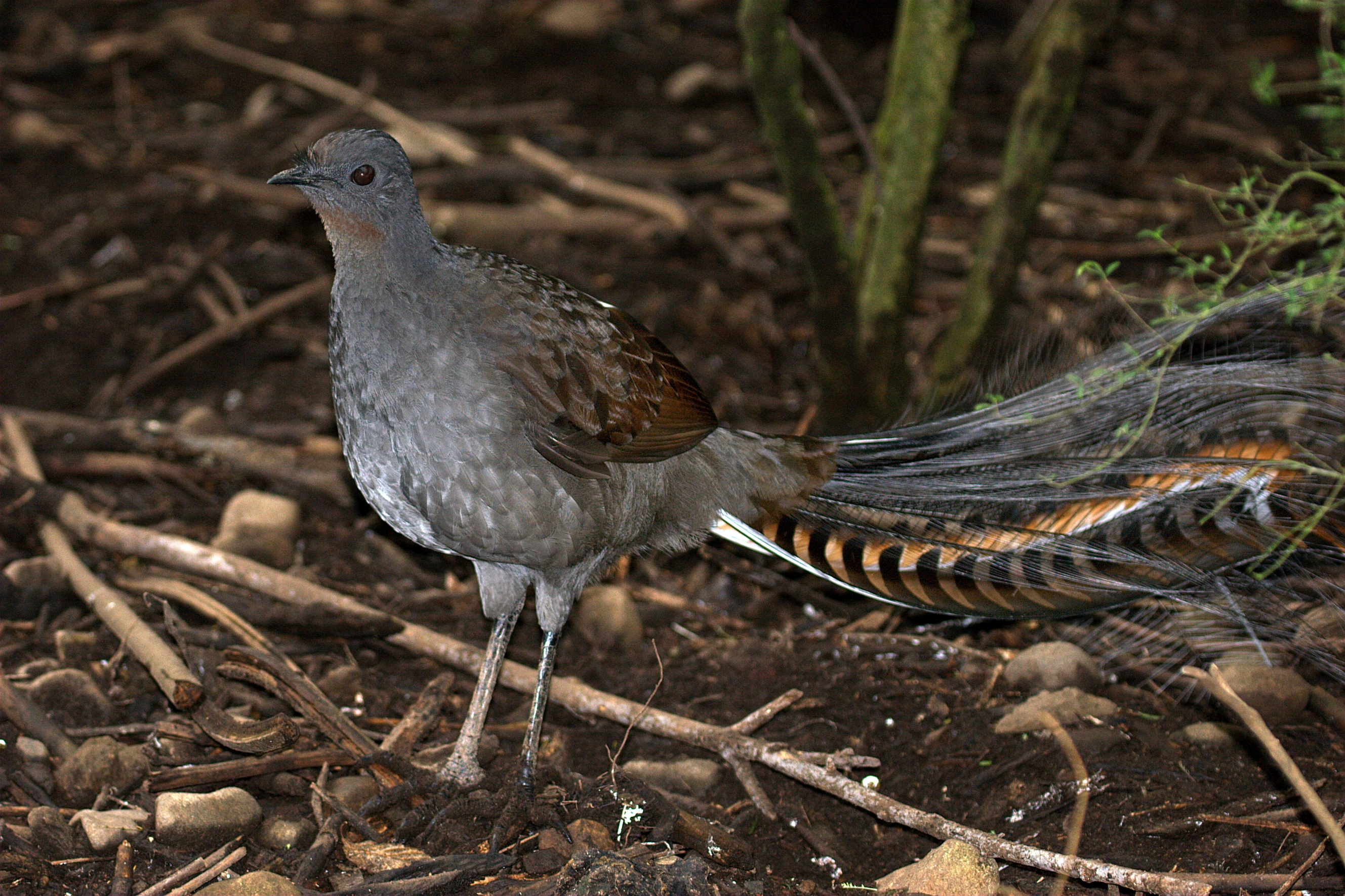
Superb lyrebird

=== Fauna ===
The varying vegetation, climates, rivers and landforms in the park have created an area rich in habitats for native animals. A study was conducted in 1996 on the fauna found at the Cathedral Range State Park. The finding of this study was that the park is home to seventeen native mammals, eight reptiles, one amphibian, one fish and eighty-seven native birds. Common animals observed in the park include the common wombat (Vombatus ursinus), eastern grey kangaroo (Macropus giganteus), the superb lyrebird (Menura novaehollandiae), peregrine falcon (Falco peregrinus) and satin bowerbird (Ptilonorhynchus violaceus). Mountain galaxias (Galaxias olidus), a native freshwater fish, was observed in the Little River just before the Little River falls. It is thought that these falls act as a barrier to trout, one of the major predators of the Mountain Galaxias. There have also been occasional sightings of the platypus (Ornithorhynchus anatinus) in the Little River.

=== Rare species ===
The 1996 fauna survey revealed some rare species found at the park that are important for conservation purposes.

The Leadbeater's possum (Gymnobelideus leadbeateri) is an iconic Australian species that is listed as critically endangered under the Environment Protection and Biodiversity Conservation Act 1999. It is found in the wet ash forests of Victoria and has become endangered due to logging, recurrent bushfires and the decline of large trees containing hollows. Although there have been no sightings of the Leadbeater's possum at the Cathedral Range it is suspected to occur there. Sightings have been made at Tweed Spur, only 3 km south from the Range. The community of alpine ash found in the park is suitable habitat for the possum.

The brush-tailed phascogale (Phascogale tapoatafa) is a small carnivorous nocturnal marsupial. It is classified as near threatened under the IUCN guidelines and as rare in Victoria. The reasons for its decline in Victoria are unknown, however the destruction of its preferred habitat is thought to have contributed to its decline. There are no official records of this species in the Cathedral Range, however suitable habitat exists in the park and its occurrence in the park is suspected.

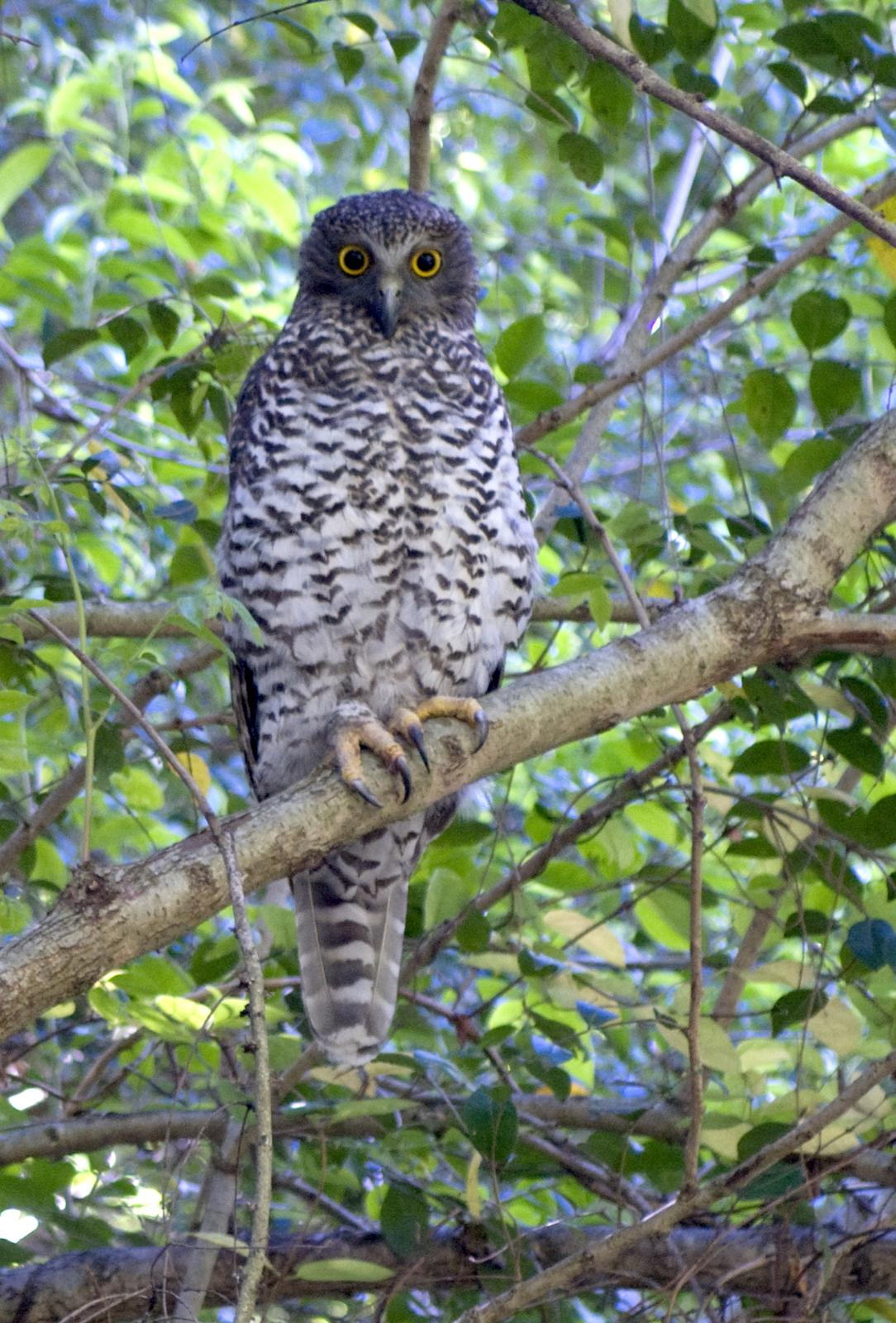
Powerful owl

The powerful owl (Ninox strenua) is Australia's largest owl and is listed as threatened in Victoria under the Flora and Fauna Guarantee Act 1988. They have been observed roosting along the Little River and it is suspected that one, if not more, pairs of powerful owls are residents in the park.

== Environmental threats ==
The Cathedral Range State Park's biodiversity is threatened by introduced flora and fauna and pathogens.

=== Flora ===
The park is home to a number of introduced plants that have become a pest. There are four main plants that are recognised as major threats to the Cathedral Range environment. These pests plants are blackberry, tutsan (Hypericum androsaemum), Japanese honeysuckle (Lonicera japonica) and Monterey pine (Pinus radiata). Blackberry is a highly invasive plant that is listed as a weed of national significance. The Japanese honeysuckle has been recorded in the riparian zones of the park. Monterey pine has been invading the park from pine plantations located on the outskirts and in the inner block of the park.

=== Fauna ===
Introduced fauna that prey on the local wildlife include foxes and feral cats and dogs. Surveys have found that a large number of Australian animals are killed each year as a result of introduced predators. Feral goats have been observed near the state park. Feral goats are destructive to the environment by overgrazing the vegetation and by disturbing the soil with their hooves.

Sambar deer (Rusa unicolor) are a large deer native to South-East Asia. They were introduced to Victoria in the 1860s for recreational hunting. There is concern on the ecological impacts this introduced species are creating, Sambar are listed in Victoria as wildlife under the Wildlife Act 1975. They are found in low numbers in the Cathedral Range State Park; however, their population is increasing generally across Victoria and they need to be monitored to minimize the risk they pose to the biodiversity of the park.

=== Pathogens ===
Investigations into the pathogens found at the park have not yet been conducted. The cinnamon fungus (Phytophthora cinnamomi), a pathogenic soil fungus resulting in devastating effects on plant communities, has not yet been recorded as occurring in the park. Myrtle wilt is suspected as occurring in the park. It is caused by a fungus, Chalara australia, that infects myrtle beech trees and results in their gradual death. The pathogen has been suggested for listing as a potentially threatening process under the Flora and Fauna Guarantee Act.

== Management ==
Cathedral Range State Park is managed by Parks Victoria. Management of the park concentrates on the conserving the natural, cultural and scenic features while still providing for a range of recreational activities for visitors. Parks Victoria list six main management directions for the park.

- To provide significant flora and fauna with special protection
- Management strategies for pest plant and animals will be implemented with the aim of eradicating or controlling these species
- Cooks Mill will have ongoing protection and interpretation
- Campsite facilities will be rationalized and enhanced
- Climbing sites will be monitored for erosion and other impacts
- Promotion of the park as a conservation reserve with outstanding scenery, natural history and recreational opportunities

The ongoing management of Cathedral Range State Park is vital. It preserves the cultural heritage and natural ecosystems of the area and provides protection for some rare communities and species while allowing the public to enjoy the spectacular landscape.
