= Yarra Ranges National Park =

National park in Victoria, Australia

- IUCN category II (national park)
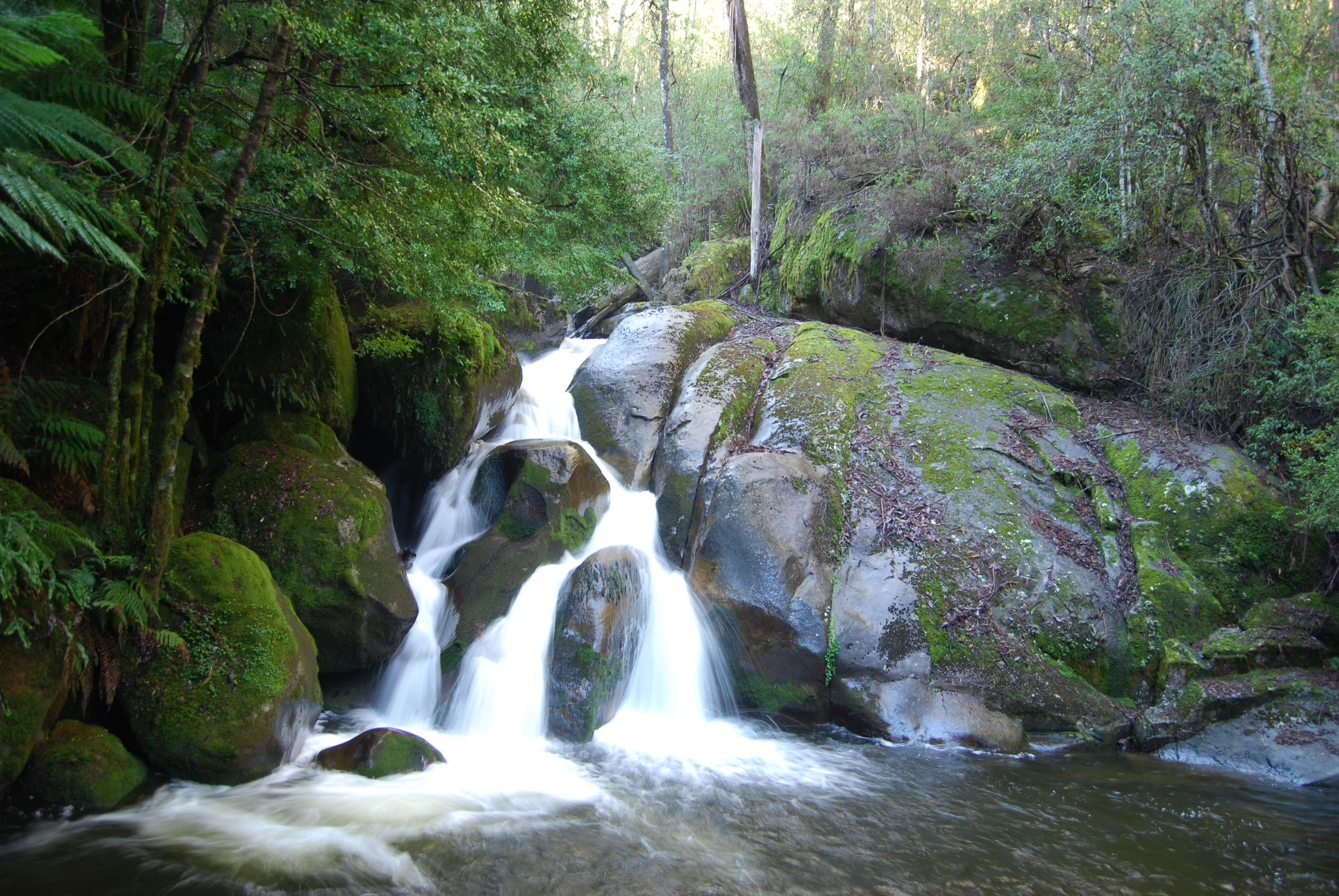
- A waterfall in the national park near Marysville

- Location within Victoria
- Location: Victoria
- Nearest city: Melbourne
- Coordinates: 37°40′50″S 145°59′27″E
- Area: 760 km^{2} (290 sq mi)
- Established: December 1995
- Visitors: 800000 (in 2002)
- Governing body: Parks Victoria
- Website: Official website

Yarra Ranges National Park is a national park located in the southeastern state of Victoria, roughly 107 km (66.5 mi) northeast of Melbourne. Established in 1995, and managed by the statutory authority Parks Victoria, the park features a carbon-rich, temperate rainforest as well as a subalpine, eucalypt-dominant forest on its northern plateau.

The park is home to large groves of mountain ash (Eucalyptus regnans), the tallest species of tree in Australia, and among the tallest in the world, with specimens reaching 80 metres (262 ft) in height. A wide diversity of flora, fauna and fungi (nearly 6,000 documented species on iNaturalist.org) make their home across the park's 76,003 hectares, including iconic Australian species such as bandicoots, echidnas, kangaroos, koalas, platypuses, possums, sugar and greater gliders, wallabies and wombats. There are nearly 200 documented species of birds in the area, with at least 60 herpetofaunal (reptile and amphibian) species, thousands of invertebrates and worms, over 900 types of fungi and mushrooms, and over 1,000 plant species.

Among the conservation challenges facing Yarra Ranges National Park are climate change and invasive species of weeds, as well as the interaction of native species with non-native, introduced invasive animals, such as European hares and rabbits, domestic sheep, feral cats and dogs, red foxes, South Asian sambar deer, and European red and fallow deer.

In winter, Lake Mountain, located on the plateau at the northern end of the park, provides cross-country skiing on both groomed and ungroomed ski trails.

== Description ==
The Yarra Ranges National Park was created in December 1995, and spans 76,003 hectares within Australia's Great Dividing Range. This National Park has been given "the International Union for the Conservation of Nature (IUCN) Category 2 (National Parks) of the United Nations List of National Parks and Protected Areas". By being category 2, it means that the park is primarily managed for the ecosystem conservation and appropriate recreation within it. The park is made up of wet mountain ash forest and cool temperate rainforest, as well as a diverse range of flora and fauna species. Mount Donna Buang, standing 1,245 metres above the town of Warburton is the park's largest mountain. The park encompasses the headwaters of the Yarra, O'Shannassy and Taggerty Rivers, as well as their reservoirs, which make up 70% of Melbourne's water supply. This is because 84% of the park is within the Designated Water Supply Catchment Area (DWSCA) which is managed under the Government's Closed Catchment Policy. Because of this, much of the park has limited access to the public to better protect the water supply catchments.

== Ecology ==
Victoria's mountain ash trees (Eucalyptus regnans) are among the most spectacular trees in the world being one of the world's tallest tree species, as well as the tallest flowering plant.

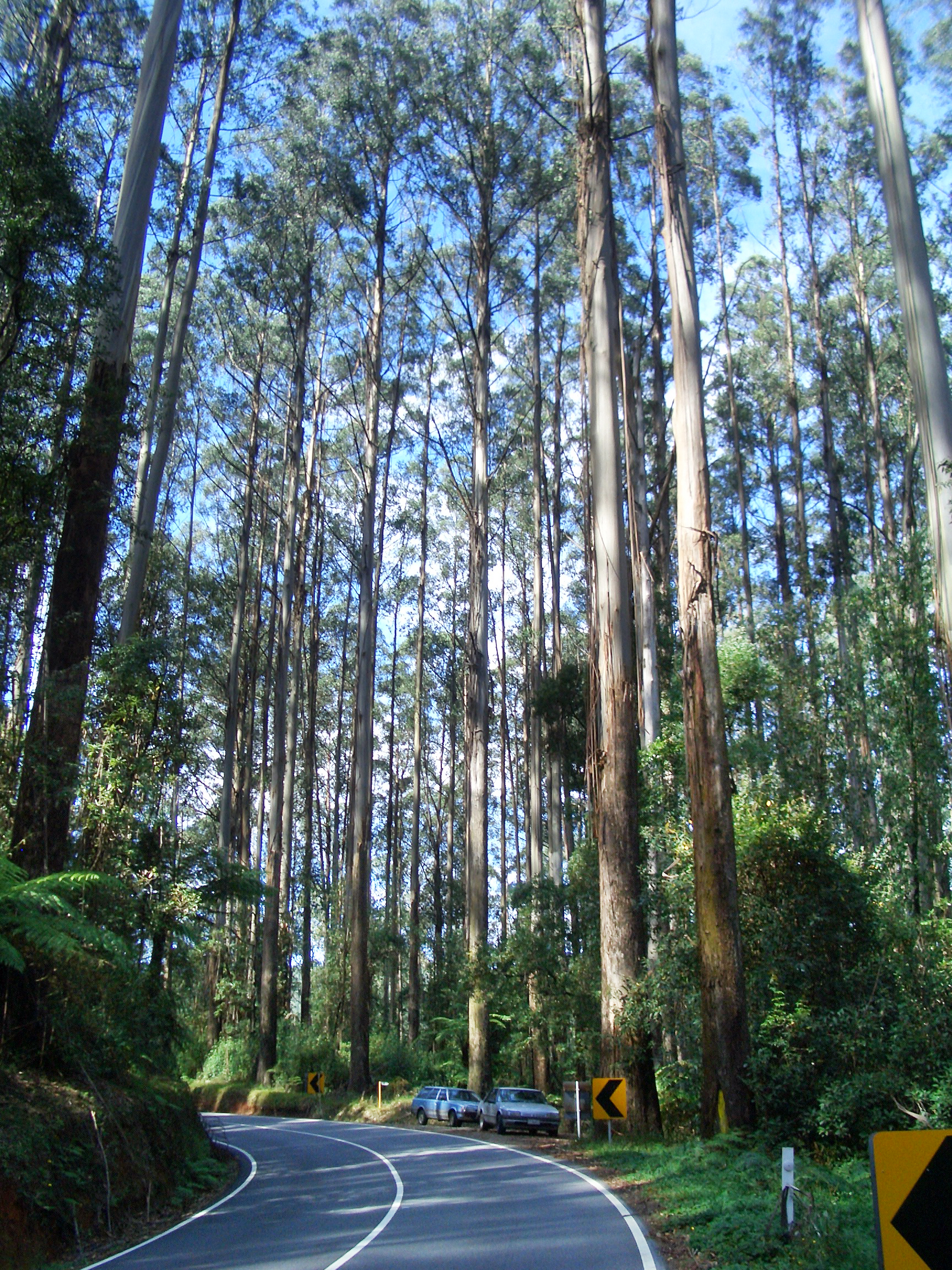
Mountain ash trees in the Black Spur, Yarra Ranges, Victoria

The mountain ash trees have a lifespan of 400 years and heights of up to 90 metres, though have been known to grow taller, with the highest recorded being the "Ferguson Tree", discovered near Healesville in 1872, standing at over 154 metres. They grow in stands that have the highest above-ground biomass of any trees in the world, allowing them to store large quantities of carbon dioxide. In 2009, a study was conducted by Brendan Mackey of the Australian National University, who found that mountain ash forests are the best in the world at locking up carbon, storing 1,867 tonnes of carbon per hectare. Once they have reached the end of their lifespan, their dead tree stumps and fallen logs continue to provide homes for at least 40 hollow-dependant species, including Victoria's faunal emblem – the endangered Leadbeater's possum (Gymnobelideus leadbeateri) – as well as the mountain brushtail possum (Trichosurus cunninghami) and the greater glider (Petauroides volans). There have also been nine epiphyte species that have been observed growing on the mountain ash trees, the most prevalent of these being liverwort (Bazzania adnexa). Other than mountain ash trees, the park also contains several threatened species of flora, including the slender tree fern (Cyathea cunninghamii).

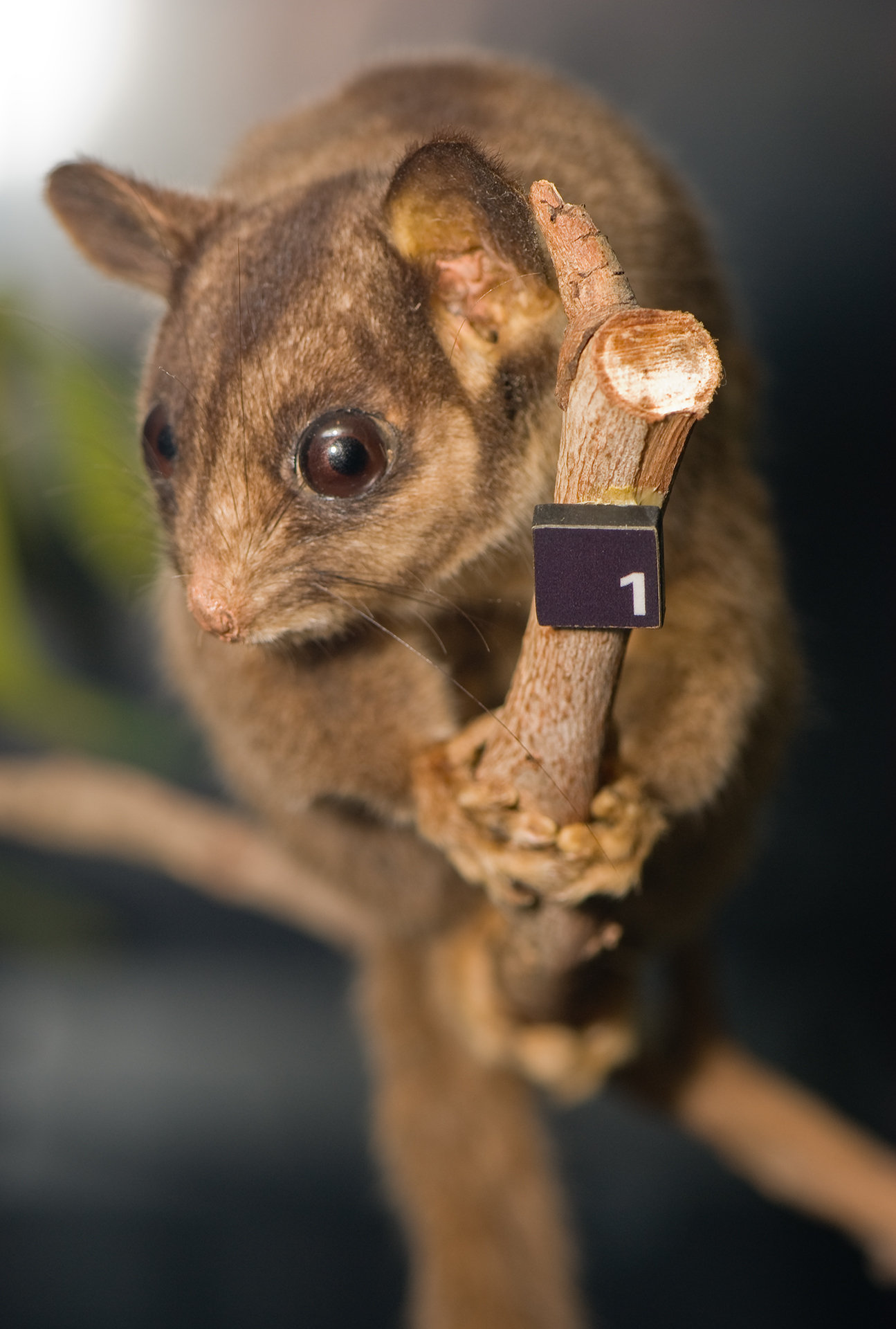
Leadbeater's possum

The park provides a habitat for many native species of fauna. There are over 120 recorded species of native birds, with some notable species being the pink robin (Petroica rodinogaster), yellow-tailed black cockatoo (Calyptorhynchus funereus), Australian king parrot (Alisterus scapularis) and the grey goshawk (Accipiter novaehollandiae). The park also contains three species of threatened owl – sooty owl (Tyto tenebricosa), powerful owl (Ninox strenua) and the barking owl (Ninox connivens). Native mammals that are frequently seen within the park are kangaroos, wallabies and wombats. The waterways are abundant with platypuses, as well as many species of fish, including redfin perch (Perca fluviatillis), European carp (Cyprinus carpio) and golden perch (Macquaria ambigua). When it comes to insects, Mount Doona Buang is home to an endemic rare species known as the Mount Donna Buang wingless stonefly (Riekoperla darlingtoni).

== Environmental threats ==
=== Weeds and feral animals ===
One of the most major environmental threats against the Yarra Ranges National Park is invasive weeds. The park is rich with native plants that are being overcome by competition by the 200 species of weeds that are spreading into the park from private gardens. In the park there are three significant types of weeds:

- Weeds of National Significance (WONS) are plants that have the most significant impacts across Australia both environmentally and economically, and are a priority for control. In the Yarra Ranges National Park some WONS are willow (Salix app.), blackberry (Rubus fruticosus spp.aggregate), boneseed (Chrysanthemoides monilifera) and bridal creeper (Asparagus asparagoides).
- Native species as weeds. There are some Australian native species that can have weed characteristics when they grow outside of their normal range and can cause harm to the park's environment. Some native weeds in the park are bluebell creeper (Billardieria heterophylla), cedar wattle (Acacia elata) and Cootamundra wattle (Acacia baileyana).
- Declared noxious weeds. These plants have been declared noxious under the Catchment and Land Protection Act 1994. These plants have the potential to cause serious environmental harm and therefore must be managed. Ragwort (Senecio jacobaea), spear thistle (Cirsium vulgare) and hawthorn (Crataegus monogyna) are all declared noxious weeds.

Invasive pest animals can have detrimental effects on the park because they prey on native wildlife and can "out-compete and displace native animals by competing for their habitat, food and water resources". Red foxes (Vulpes vulpes) are an established pest animal in all of Victoria. When it comes to the Yarra Ranges National Park, mainly trapping methods are employed to manage the issue. In Victoria there is a program that rewards eligible Victorian hunters with a $10 bounty reward for each individual fox killed, subject to the Victorian Fox Bounty Terms and Conditions. Due to this, and the amount of foxes in the park, Parks Victoria opens up the park occasionally to allow hunters in to help manage the fox issue. Other pest animals within the park are European rabbits (Oryctolagus cuniculus) and feral cats.

=== Fires ===
Fires are a natural part of Australian environment because they are needed for the renewal of ecosystems; however, in recent times these bushfires have been occurring outside normal frequencies, intensities, seasons and scale of what fauna and flora can tolerate. To reduce the potential impact of fire on the park, controlled burns are conducted throughout specific months of the year and are carefully managed by Parks Victoria and the Department of Environment, Land, Water and Planning. The controlled burns are used to reduce the amount of fuel, such as dead wood, leaf litter, bark or shrubs that could easily catch alight during the summer months. A reduced amount of fuel decreases the impact of a bushfire because it lowers its intensity.

=== Climate change ===
Climate change is having a major impact on all ecosystems within Australia, and the Yarra Ranges National Park is no exception. As the temperature increases, the average rainfall decreases, meaning less water flowing in the waterways. Less water reduces water quality that is supplied to Melbourne and used by the fauna and flora within the park. The annual surface temperature is predicted to increase by 0.6-1C and wind speed is set to increase by 6%. All these changes will impact what makes up the park's ecosystem and how it functions.

== Heritage ==
European colonists found it difficult to access the area. It was eventually settled in 1860 and was seen as a valuable area for timber. Soon after, the area was recognised as a good place for water catchments, so the Maroondah and Upper Yarra dams were built.

== Management ==
Yarra Ranges National Park is managed by Parks Victoria, the Department of Environment, Land, Water and Planning (DELWP) and Melbourne Water. Parks Victoria released a Management Plan for the park in 2002 in which they outlined the significant management directions for the Park, all of which are still used today.

Parks Victoria aims to preserve significant conservation areas by preserving old-growth forests, as well as specific significant flora species. Parks will do this by improving knowledge of flora in the park by encouraging flora surveys and research on significant species to improve conservation management schemes for specific species. To provide special protection for significant plant species by actively managing threatening processes, such as weed invasion. To protect the parks native fauna species and maintain genetic diversity. This will be done by maintaining and enhancing fauna habitat through the control of potentially threatening processes, such as pest plant and animal control. To encourage surveys of fauna and faunal habitats in the park, giving priority to threatened species to ensure that the park continues to support viable populations of each endangered species. The last management strategy to protect fauna species is to communicate the policy of no feeding of wildlife in the park, and to prohibit the distribution and sale of birdseed within the park. When it comes to fire management, Parks Victoria allows open days for locals to come into the park and gather wood. This helps to get rid of fire fuel that is present in the understory of the forest.

Protecting water resources in the water supply catchments. This will be done by maintaining the Restricted Access Policy for the Designated Water Supply Catchment Area (DWSCA), by continuing to prohibit domestic pets and control feral animals in the DWSCA to protect the water resources from any potential forms of contamination. The DWSCA will also be protected from wildfire in accordance with the Draft Yarra Ranges National Park Fire Protection Plan. The last management strategy to protect the water supply catchments is to monitor the effects of roads and traffic that transverse the DWSCA to ensure that there is minimal soil erosion that could affect the water supply.

== Effectiveness ==
The current management strategies outlined in the Yarra Ranges National Park Management Plan regarding the Restricted Access Policy is efficient at maintaining the parks water resources. By limiting human access to the Designated Water Supply Catchment Area (DWSCA) it prevents some forms of contaminants from entering the supply catchments because the area remains clear of rubbish. If rubbish left behind in the park by people entered the water catchments, it could have a damaging effect on the purity of the water that is supplied to Melbourne. The restriction on people feeding wildlife has also benefited the native species within the park because it allows the ecosystem to function and evolve without human interference.

One of the main reasons the park was established was to protect mountain ash trees, however, their numbers have declined due to climate change, bush fires and close-proximity logging to the park. Climate change cannot be prevented, but significant fire damage can be. To decrease the severity of fires within the Park, more planned burns to get rid of a majority of fire fuel could be implemented by Parks Victoria and DELWP. When it comes to close-proximity logging, the effect on mountain ash trees is detrimental. To help prevent the further loss of these endangered carbon-rich forests, a policy could be implement by the Victorian Government to prevent logging from occurring within a 20 kilometre area of the park.

With the number of mountain ash trees decreasing, faunal habitat is also being lost. This is of great concern when it comes to Victoria's faunal emblem – the Leadbeater's possum, as well as many other threatened species of fauna within the park. Parks Victoria and DELWP have management strategies in place that do protect these threatened species from pest species and human interaction, however there are no measures to combat the increased threat of climate change. When it comes to protecting threatened species of fauna, there are breeding programs implemented in Healesville Sanctuary to increase specific species population rates. Once these animals reach a certain age, Zoos Victoria coordinates their efforts with the park's ranger to release these animals into the park. In regards to faunal habitat being lost, the park's open wood days may be displacing animals if people honour the restriction for wood collection in the park. This cannot be managed, so the only way to prevent this is to find a way to manage it, or to stop the open wood days altogether.

To help better protect endangered fauna and flora within the area, there is a proposal for the creation of the Great Forest National Park. This proposed park will add 355,000 hectares to existing parks and reserves. The proposed park will supply over 4 million people with some of the highest quality drinking water, help to protect a greater portion of mountain ash forest and provide a greater area for protecting endangered and rare wildlife.

== See also ==
- Protected areas of Victoria
- List of national parks of Australia
- Cement Creek Plantation
