= Marysville, Victoria =

Marysville
- Town
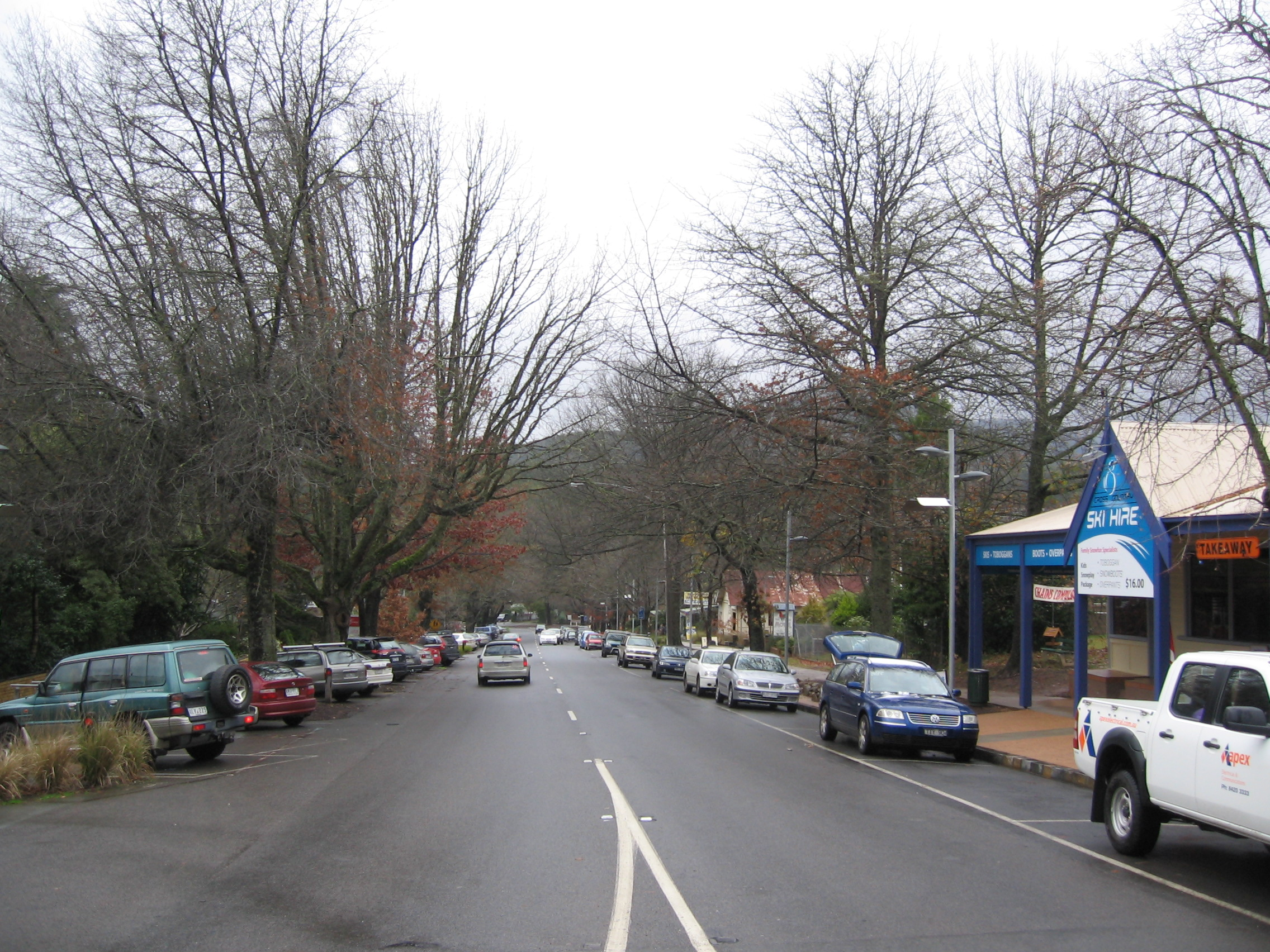
- The main street of Marysville in winter, before the fires of February 2009.

- Interactive map of Marysville
- Coordinates: 37°30′0″S 145°44′0″E
- Country: Australia
- State: Victoria
- Region: Hume
- LGA: Shire of Murrindindi
- Location: 99 km (62 mi) from Melbourne; 34 km (21 mi) from Healesville; 110 km (68 mi) from Seymour

Government
  - State electorate: Eildon
  - Federal division: Indi
- Elevation: 430 m (1,410 ft)

Population
  - Total: 501 (2021 census)
- Postcode: 3779
- Mean max temp: 17.5 °C (63.5 °F)
- Mean min temp: 8.0 °C (46.4 °F)
- Annual rainfall: 725 mm (28.5 in)

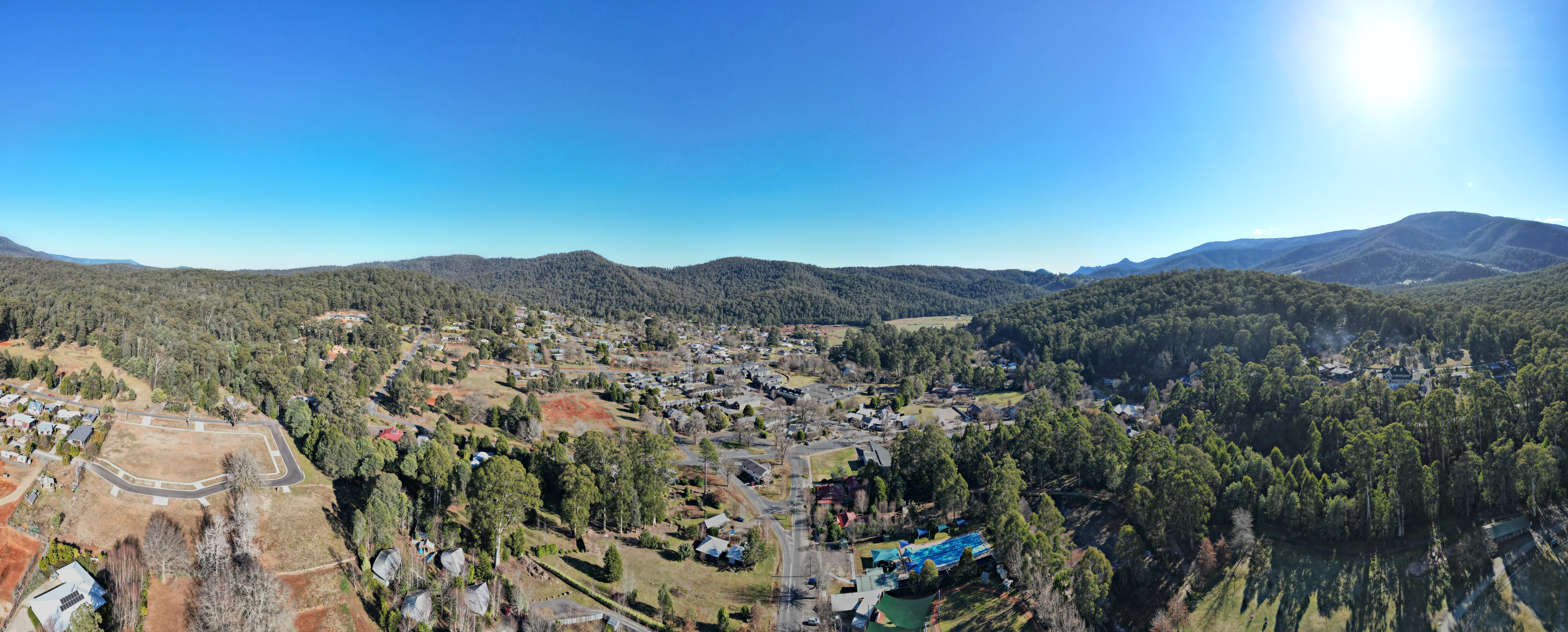
Marysville and Lake Mountain aerial panorama

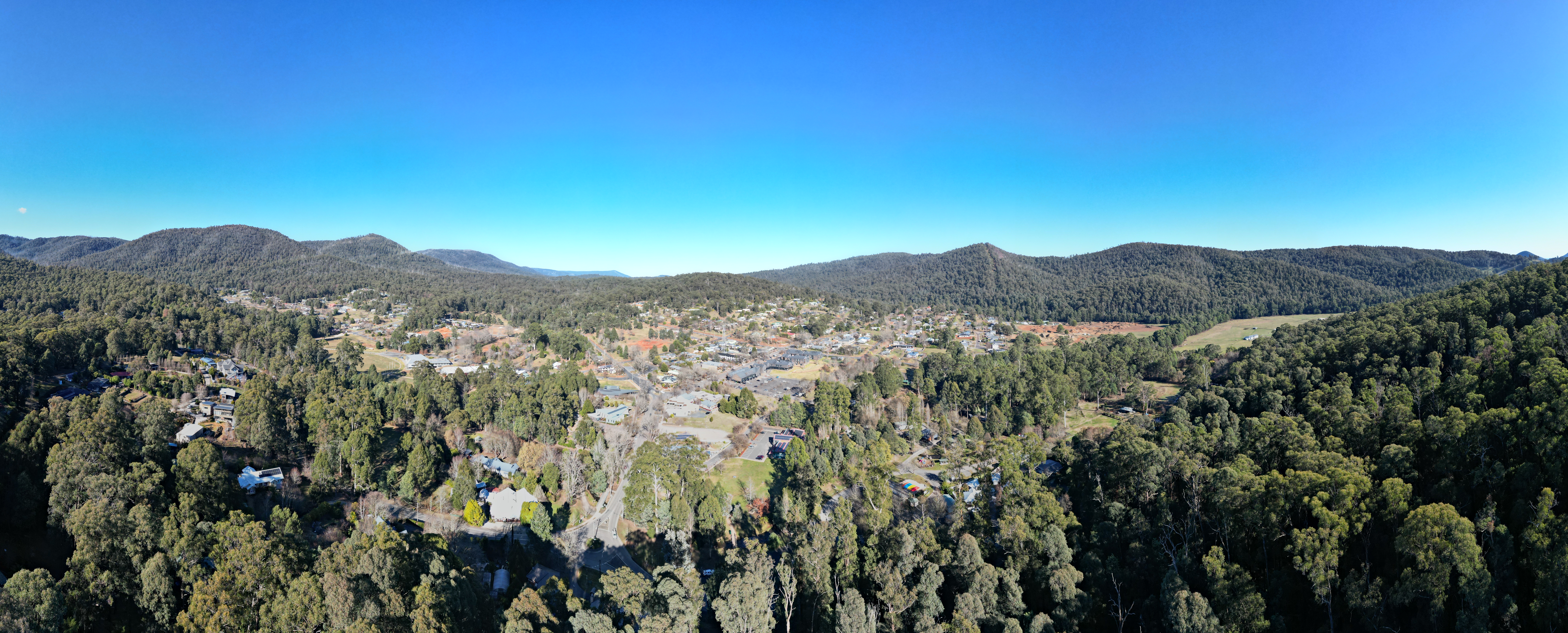
Aerial panorama of Marysville, set amongst the Great Dividing Range

Marysville is a town in the Shire of Murrindindi in Victoria, Australia, about 34 km (21 mi) north-east of Healesville and 41 km (25 mi) south of Alexandra. The town, which previously had a population of over 500 people, was devastated by the Murrindindi Mill bushfire on 7 February 2009. On 19 February 2009 the official death toll was 45. Around 90% of the town's buildings were destroyed. Prior to the Black Saturday fire the population in 2006 was 519. At the 2011 census, the population had reduced to 226, by the 2016 census it had risen to 394. The population has increased to 501 people by the 2021 census.

== History ==
The town was established as a stopping point on the Yarra Track, the route to the Woods Point and Upper Goulburn goldfields, with a butcher's shop and store in existence by the time the town was surveyed in 1864. It prospered following the reconstruction of the Yarra Track as an all weather dray and coach road under engineer Clement Wilks in the 1870s. It was named after Mary Steavenson, the wife of Assistant Commissioner of Roads and Bridges John Steavenson after whom the popular Steavenson Falls are named.

The Marysville Post Office opened on 1 March 1865 followed by a school in 1870, and a public hall, library and mechanics institute in 1890. By the 1920s, Marysville had become a tourist destination, with the Marysville Tourist and Progress Association formed in 1924. Attractions promoted at the time were fern gullies, views, and walking tracks to Steavenson Falls. Twelve guest houses had been established by 1920, one of the best known of these being the Cumberland Guest House. At this time a rail service operated between Melbourne and nearby Healesville, and the town became a popular destination for couples on their honeymoon.

In 2004 a telemovie, Little Oberon starring Sigrid Thornton, was filmed in and around Marysville.

The town came under serious threat during the Black Friday bushfires in 1939, where residents saw the fire cross from Mt Gorden to Mount Margaret. At that time only one house in Marysville belonging to Stan Postlethwaite was destroyed. The No.1 Mill 5 miles (8.0 km) from Marysville was destroyed and the town of Narbethong was wiped out. The Ash Wednesday bushfires of 1983 also came close to Marysville but burnt around the town and caused no damage to property.

=== Black Saturday bushfires ===
On 7 February 2009, a bushfire destroyed most of the town, including the primary school, police station, The Cumberland, and almost all of its houses.

Residents able to leave the town just prior to the fire were directed to a temporary relief centre at Alexandra High School. Others sheltered overnight in Gallipoli Park before being evacuated to Alexandra.

The entire town was declared a crime scene and was effectively closed off while Victorian and Federal police recovered bodies and conducted investigations. It was reopened to the public on 23 March 2009.

In February 2014 a class action trial against electricity company SP AusNet was due to begin in the Victorian Supreme Court. It was alleged that the fire was caused by a "break in an electrical conductor on a power pole near the Murrindindi Saw Mill." A A$300 million settlement was reached before the trial began.

The town before the fire is viewable in Google Maps Street View which provides a virtual time-capsule tour of the area. As of June 2014 the imagery has been updated to images from March 2013, but the old imagery is still available under the "See more dates" function.

== Industry and employment ==
Marysville's primary industry is tourism. Prior to the fire, it contained numerous cafes, art galleries, restaurants, and craft shops. It has been used as a base for the Lake Mountain ski resort. During the snow season, the population of the town has been known to double or even triple, due to the influx of other hospitality and tourism caterers, such as ski hire, toboggan hire, chain hire, and many other profitable ventures associated with snowplay and skiing. During summer Marysville is frequented by many bikers, particularly on weekends. Marysville is cradled between two of Victoria's best motorcycling roads, the Black Spur & The Reefton Spur. It is also popular with recreational cyclists. There are many tourist attractions throughout the area, such as Bruno's Sculpture Garden (which was badly damaged in the 2009 fires but mostly restored since), and Steavenson Falls. The town is also used as an access point to Yarra Ranges National Park and Upper Yarra Reservoir Park.

The local water treatment plant run by Goulburn Valley Water claimed the 2015 title of best drinking water in state and national titles and later second best in the world. It now boasts about its water in a road sign and on a special water fountain in the town.

== Gallery ==
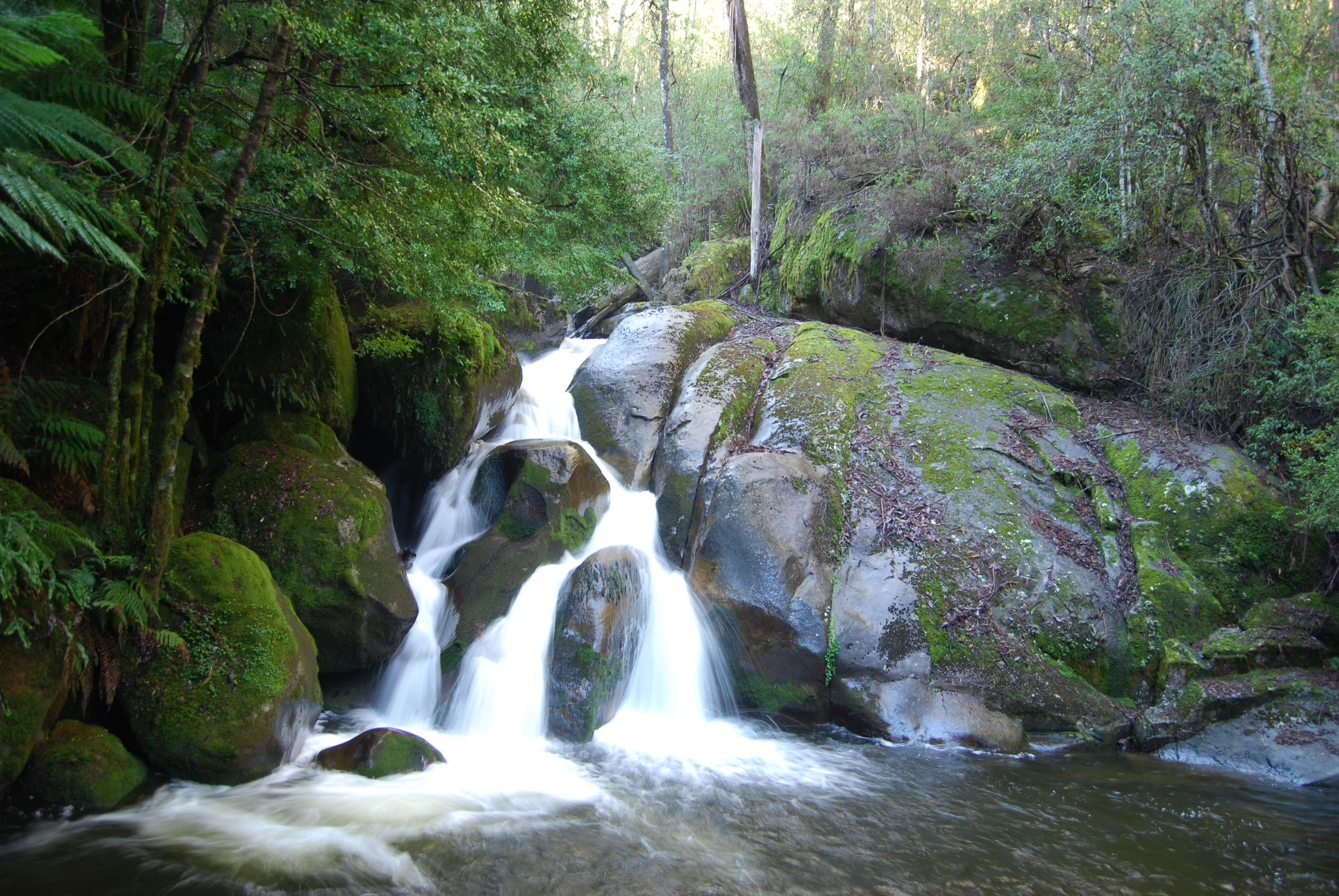
Yarra Ranges National Park, near Marysville

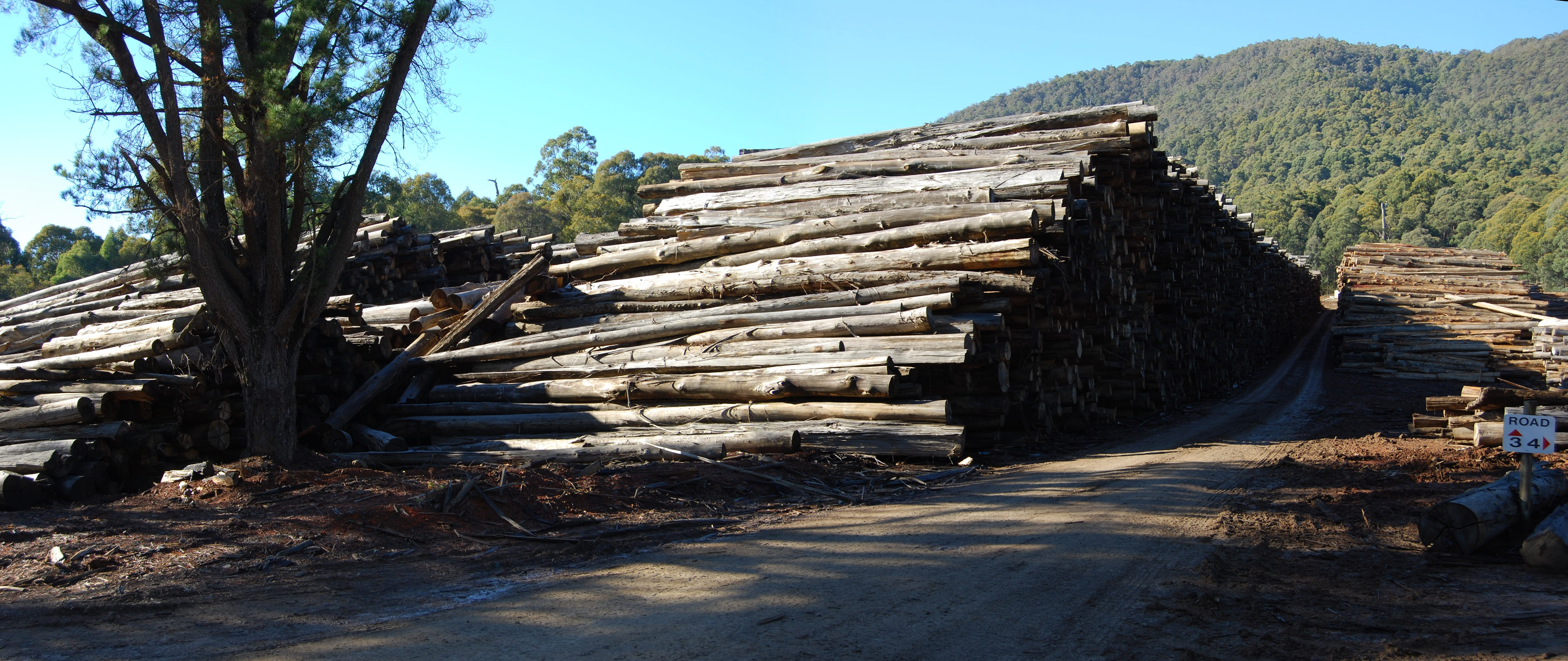
A log dump near Marysville
