= Mount Timbertop =

Mountain in Victoria, Australia

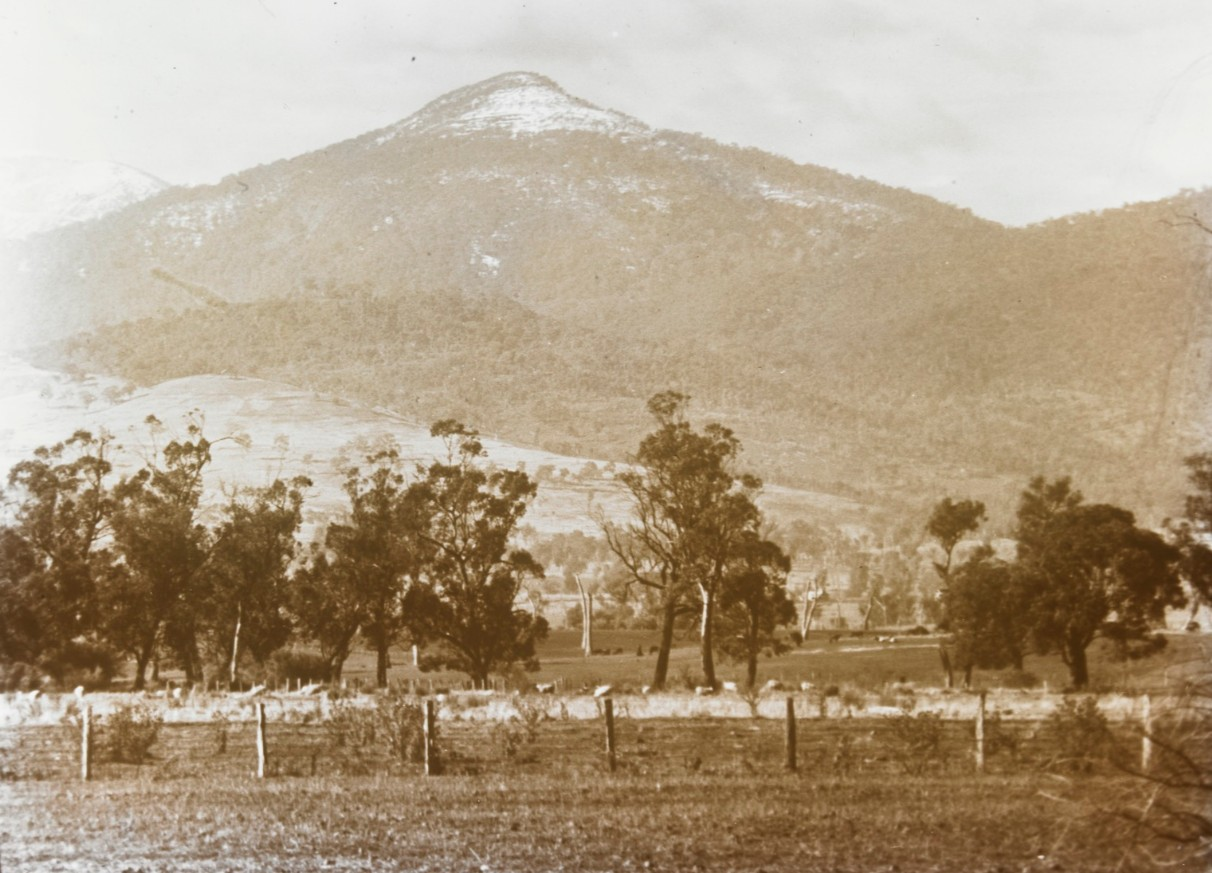
- Mount Timbertop near Mansfield (ca.1875-ca.1938)

Highest point
- Elevation: 1,292 metres (4,239 ft) AHD
- Prominence: 260 m (850 ft)
- Listing: Mountains of Victoria
- Coordinates: 37°9′11″S 146°19′6″E

Geography
- Location within Victoria
- Country: Australia
- State: Victoria
- Parent range: Victorian Alps, Great Dividing Range

Climbing
- Easiest route: Hike

Mount Timbertop is a forested mountain in north-eastern Victoria, Australia rising above the Delatite River valley, 23 km south-east of Mansfield. It forms part of the southern Victorian Alps within the Great Dividing Range and lies within the Howqua Hills State Forest. The mountain likely takes its name from the distinctive timbered ridgeline, and is best known for its close proximity to the Geelong Grammar School campus of Timbertop, situated at the foot of the mountain, with the mountain being highly frequented and traversed across the year as part of various outdoor activities of the school.

== Geology, flora and fauna ==
The summit of Mount Timbertop is composed of the Timbertop Conglomerate, part of the Mansfield Group from the Upper Devonian period. This unit consists of alluvial deposits, including cobble conglomerate pebbly sandstone, and cross-bedded sandstone. Beneath the summit, including the Timbertop Saddle, the mountain consists of the Kevington Creek Formation of the Delatite Group, also from the Devonian. This formation is composed of subaerial pyroclastics, including rhyodacite and rhyolite ignimbrite, coarsely quartz- and feldspar-phyric, with minor ashtone. The presence of rhyolitic rock in the lower slopes is likely the reason for the name of the nearby waterfall, Rhyolite Falls, located on the northern side of Mount Timbertop.

The vegetation of Mount Timbertop reflects its location within the montane forests of the Victorian Alps. Lower slopes are dominated by tall open forests of mountain ash (Eucalyptus regnans), among the tallest flowering plants in the world, indicating deep soils and high annual rainfall. At higher elevations, mountain ash gives way to alpine ash (Eucalyptus delegatensis), a species adapted to colder conditions and snow-prone environments. Exposed upper ridgelines and the summit support snow gum (Eucalyptus pauciflora) woodland, with an understorey of heath shrubs, native grasses, and alpine herbs. Fauna that is typically found surrounding Mount Timbertop includes wombats, king parrots and lyrebirds.

Mount Timbertop is the namesake of Timbertop wattle (Acacia daviesii), a flowering plant which is endemic to the mountain and another small pocket around the Howqua Valley. The mountain is also one of three small areas of Victoria where sparkling mint-bush (Prostanthera rhombea) can be found. After the 2006 bushfires, much of the mountain's understorey was colonised by blanket leaf (Bedfordia arborescens).

== History ==
The Taungurung Aboriginal people frequented the area surrounding Mount Timbertop, who would head into the mountains in order to collect food, including bogong moths and yam daisies. The Taungurung name for Mount Timbertop is "Warrambat".

The first European to have likely passed through the region was Major Thomas Mitchell in 1836. In the 1860s and 1870s, pastoralists expanded cattle grazing into the high country, using the mountain's lower slopes during summer months. To the south of Mount Timbertop, gold was found around the Howqua Hills region in the 1860s. Timber resources on and near the mountain were exploited, with selective logging of mountain ash and alpine occurring from the 1880s onwards.

The first vehicular ascent of the mountain was achieved on December 22, 1920, by Mr J. Flood.

== Geography ==
The summit of Mount Timbertop is best accessed by a short and steep hiking track that leads up from Timbertop Saddle, where vehicles can be parked. This hiking track, known to Timbertop students as "The Switchbacks", is home to several hikes and runs across their school year. A termly run, known as "The Struggle", sees students run from the school campus and up the nearby Howqua Track, where they must then reach as far up the mountain (or summiting if possible) as they can before a siren is sounded and they must run back, with different levels of the switchbacks as progress markers, so as to improve each term. A track continues off the summit to the east, known as the "Skyline Track" as it follows the "Skyline Ridge", which then joins onto the logging track road known as Doughtys Road, which leads to other tracks that can reach either Mount Buller or Mirimbah. Another track, less pronounced, leads off the mountain summit, to the south, following the ridgeline, where it adjoins Muzza's Saddle, where the track continues along to Sheepyard Flat, or back to Timbertop Saddle via Cold Creek, where potable water can be found.

== See also ==
- Mount Buller Alpine Resort
- Merrijig
