= Timbertop =

Campus of Geelong Grammar School in Australia

Coordinates: 37.127868°S 146.305211°E

- A view toward the summit of Mount Timbertop from the school grounds

Information
- Type: Specialist
- Motto: Magis est in nobis ("There is more in us than we know")
- Established: 1953
- Head of campus: Ross Hopkins
- Years offered: Year 9
- Website: ggs.vic.edu.au

Timbertop is an Australian boarding and co-educational campus of Geelong Grammar School located near Mansfield, Victoria. It is named after Mount Timbertop which towers directly over the campus.

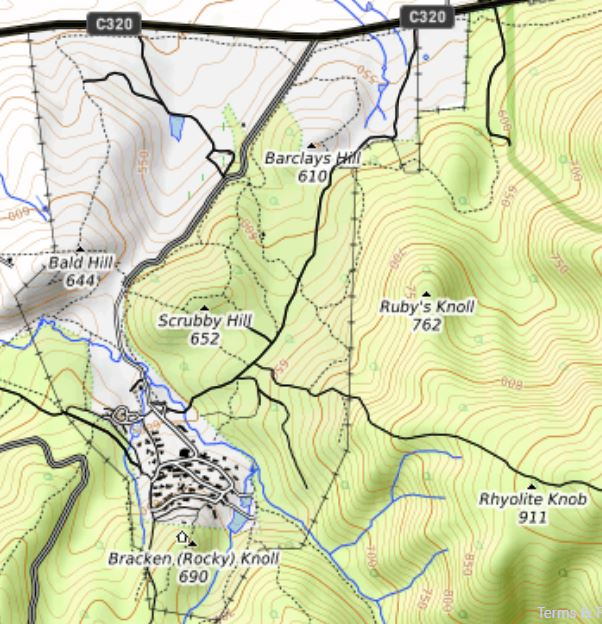
Map of the Timbertop campus at Merrijig

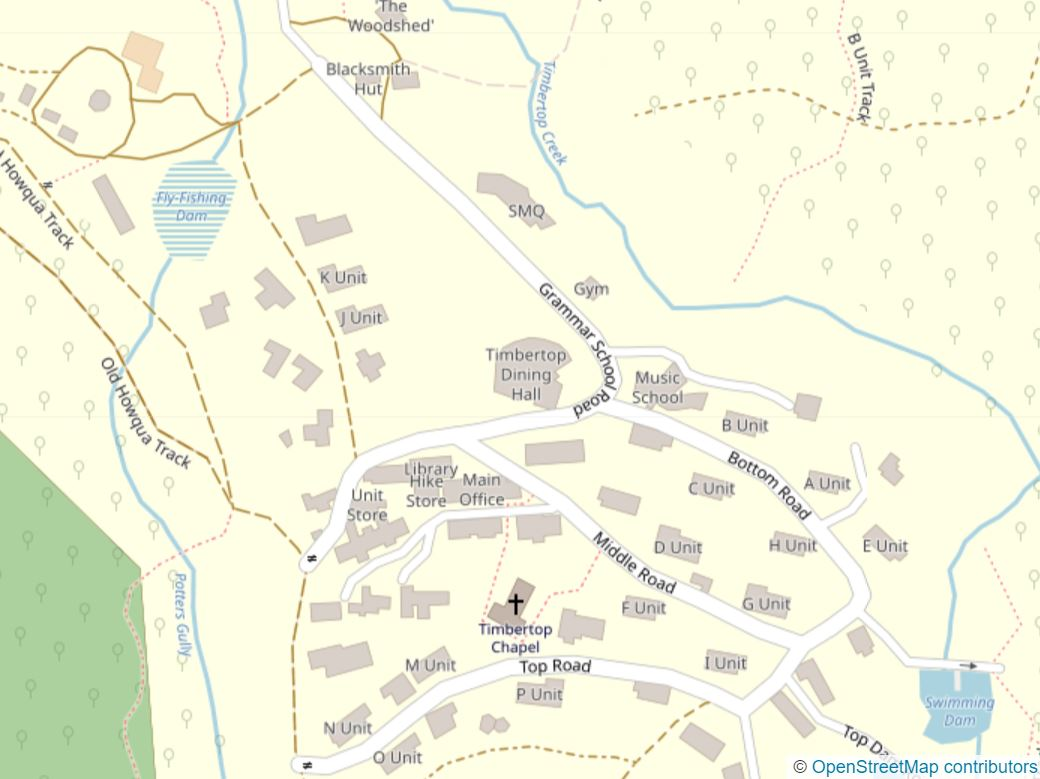

Timbertop was established in 1953 by then headmaster James Darling. The campus is attended by year-nine students attending Geelong Grammar School, although as there are limited spaces not all students are able to attend. As of 2017 approximately 240 boys and girls attend Timbertop. They are divided into single-sex "units" of approximately 15 students. They participate in a wide variety of physical activities including running, hiking and skiing, as well as a normal academic routine. Additionally, students at Timbertop do not have access to devices such as computers, mobile phones or digital cameras and external news is typically received via newspaper or radio. Almost all communication from students to family and friends off campus is carried through hand-written letters. In order for students to receive hot water for showers, cleaning and heating, they must chop their own wood which is then placed in a boiler accompanying each unit building.

== History ==
In December 1951, Geelong Grammar School announced that it had an option on land near Mount Timbertop where they would conduct normal schooling combined with outdoor activities that would foster independence and initiative. The concept was the initiative of headmaster James Darling, who was inspired by the likes of Kurt Hahn and England's Outward Bound schools.

The Timbertop campus opened at the start of the 1953 school year with 40 students who built sheds and created paths, roads and a plantation. The campus consists of 800 hectares (2,000 acres) with a frontage onto the Delatite River.

On 2 February 1960, Graeme Vanner, a student who joined the main Corio campus in Geelong House (now Allen House) the year prior, then D Unit at Timbertop, drowned during a swimming test in the school's swimming dam on the second day of the term. He is buried in the Barrabool Hills Cemetery, in Highton, Geelong.

On 5 December 1978, the then-principal, the Honorable Charles Fisher, whilst en route to Timbertop as part of a routine visit from the main campus, fell victim to fatigued driving, potentially owing to the lengthy drive between Geelong and Timbertop, and subsequently drove his car off the Maroondah Highway and crashed into a tree in Kanumbra, outside of Merton, killing him instantly. He died at the age of 57 and was cremated. A memorial service took place at the Corio Campus three days later on 8 December 1978.

In 1996, Tim Collins, a student in G Unit, collapsed and died as a result of a congenital heart condition whilst on the final six-day-long hike of Timbertop near Peters Corner, the intersection of Circuit Road and an old 4WD track that leads down to King Hut below Mount Stirling. Both Graeme Vanner and Tim Collins have since been immortalised in the form of a memorial grove of trees beneath the summit of Bald Hill, planted in June 2024, occupying a vista on one of the most prominent geographic features on the campus.

In 2006, a large bushfire, which had not only encircled nearby Mount Buller and its ski resort, but had reached the rear of the school grounds, resulted in the entire campus being evacuated in a space of three hours. In this time students and staff reputedly ran up to the chapel to "bid farewell" in case it chapel succumbed to the encroaching bushfire. No buildings were damaged by the bushfire.

In 2009, the Timbertop Campus was forced to evacuate to the main Geelong Grammar School Campus at Corio due to severe bushfires close to the campus.

On 8 May 2018, the school was made aware that Narelle Davies, a nurse at the campus, had not returned from an endurance horse training ride in the Howqua Hills area due south of the school that was planned to end on the afternoon before and was subsequently reported missing. Davies had last been seen on the previous Saturday at 3:00 pm leaving a campsite beside the Howqua Track. The last known contact with her was a text to a colleague saying that she was "on Eagles' Peaks". Davies, who was leading her horse Depict downhill amidst steep terrain and not wearing a helmet, when she tripped and fell, making her unconscious. Once she became conscious, she had become disorientated, and as she had walked into a remote valley was unable to gain mobile phone reception. By Sunday morning, Narelle, who was located near the source of Malcolm's Creek, had resorted to building shelters and drinking water from the creek and remained there for the next three nights in near-freezing temperatures. Her horse remained with her for the duration of this time. The school's teaching and general program was promptly suspended as a majority of teachers and staff were called to assist in the search and rescue alongside the Victoria State Emergency Service, with a skeleton group of teachers remaining to organise alternate school plans. This large cohort of teachers from Timbertop proved to be beneficial to the assistance of the emergency workers as the teachers had frequented the area where she was reported missing as part of hikes and other various activities, where they could provide insight and local knowledge. By Tuesday evening, searchers found a stirrup which belonged to Davies and hoof prints. Rebecca Cody, the principal of Geelong Grammar, arrived at the Timbertop campus to bring support and the best wishes from the other campuses and also assisted the Mansfield police.

On Wednesday at 8:30 am, Davies was found, spotted walking alongside Depict to a search camp of Timbertop teachers. The campus celebrated by organising a bus trip to Shepparton, where the students watched a movie at a cinema and took part in 10-pin bowling, with the celebrations being dubbed the "Narellebrations".

== Curriculum ==
=== Academic program ===
Timbertop has an academic program much like other schools. For five days of every week, classes take place on the Timbertop campus. Students take part in compulsory "core" classes, such as English, mathematics, science, Australian curriculum history and positive education. Students must also choose electives from a list including German, French, Chinese, Japanese, music, physical education, elective history, geography, agriculture and art.

The school introduced positive education to Timbertop in 2009. It is a compulsory core subject.

=== Outdoors program ===
Timbertop has an extensive outdoors program which encompasses hiking, downhill skiing, cross-country skiing, rogaining (a team-based orienteering sport) and camping.

Students begin with two training sessions at the start of the year, in which they are taught to use and clean trangia stoves, pitch tents, and correctly use their hiking gear. They then complete other hikes to places such as Mount Stirling, The Bluff and Mt. Buller, to familiarise themselves with the area and to build up to a three-day hike where they choose the route and its difficulty themselves. The first "solo" session also occurs, with students spending a day by themselves in a tent on the Timbertop campus, where they reflect and think about goals for the year and future life.

In term 2, students take part in a unit hike, but most of the term is taken up with community service and school service; a second "solo" also occurs.

In term 3, students participate in downhill skiing on Mount Buller where they do lessons and free skiing. The students also learn cross-country skiing on two unit-based trips on Mount Stirling near GGS hut and on the Bogong High Plains. At the end of the term, students take part in a unit-based "Mystery Hike".

Term 4 is the culmination of the outdoors program. Returning students participate in Option Hikes 1 and 2, which vary in difficulty depending on the choices of the hike groups. The last unit based outdoor trip is a Walk Canoe Raft, where units do some walking, canoeing, and rafting (or sledding) near William Hovell Dam. Hike Rogaine takes place towards the middle of the term. Students walk to Mt Stirling, then compete in a Rogaine on Mt Stirling. The Hiking year culminates in the Four and Six Day hikes, where students choose and design routes, and are given a large amount of autonomy in choosing where they go, distances walked, and food taken. Students then partake in their third and final "Solo".

In 2018, the final Unit trip "Walk Canoe Raft" was replaced (indefinitely) with a third Option Hike.

In total, students camp for between 50 and 55 nights during the year.

=== Running program ===
Running, and in particular trail running (given the rural and hilly location of the school) makes up a large part of the Timbertop program. Students run between two or three times a week depending on the term. The aim of the running program is to build the resilience and fitness of the students, to prepare them for the Timbertop Marathon, and ultimately later life.

"Crossies" provide a base line for fitness and are increased incrementally every term. The term 1 crossie is about 3 kilometres long, eventually reaching about 5 kilometres by term 4. Crossies are run every week before or after school starts (depending on term).

"Long Runs" are longer than the other runs. The length of the runs increases every week, starting (at the start of term 1) at approximately 4 km, and ending (at the end of term 4) at around 23 km, the penultimate run before the Marathon. This run involves running up West Ridge to the summit of Mt Buller and back to the campus.

"Wildfire Crossies" are short runs done in terms 2 and 3, designed to build fitness through interval training.

The Timbertop running program builds up to Marathon at the end of term 4, which varies in length depending on the decision of staff, and available tracks to run, but is generally 33 km long. Whilst the Timbertop Marathon is much shorter than a standard marathon (42.195 kilometres) it takes place on rough tracks and with hilly/mountainous terrain.

=== Hobbies program ===
The Hobbies program takes place in Term 3, before ski days. Students select two hobbies from a list that includes activities including but not limited to Snowboarding, Fly Fishing, Horse Riding and Mountain Biking.

== Structure ==
=== Units ===
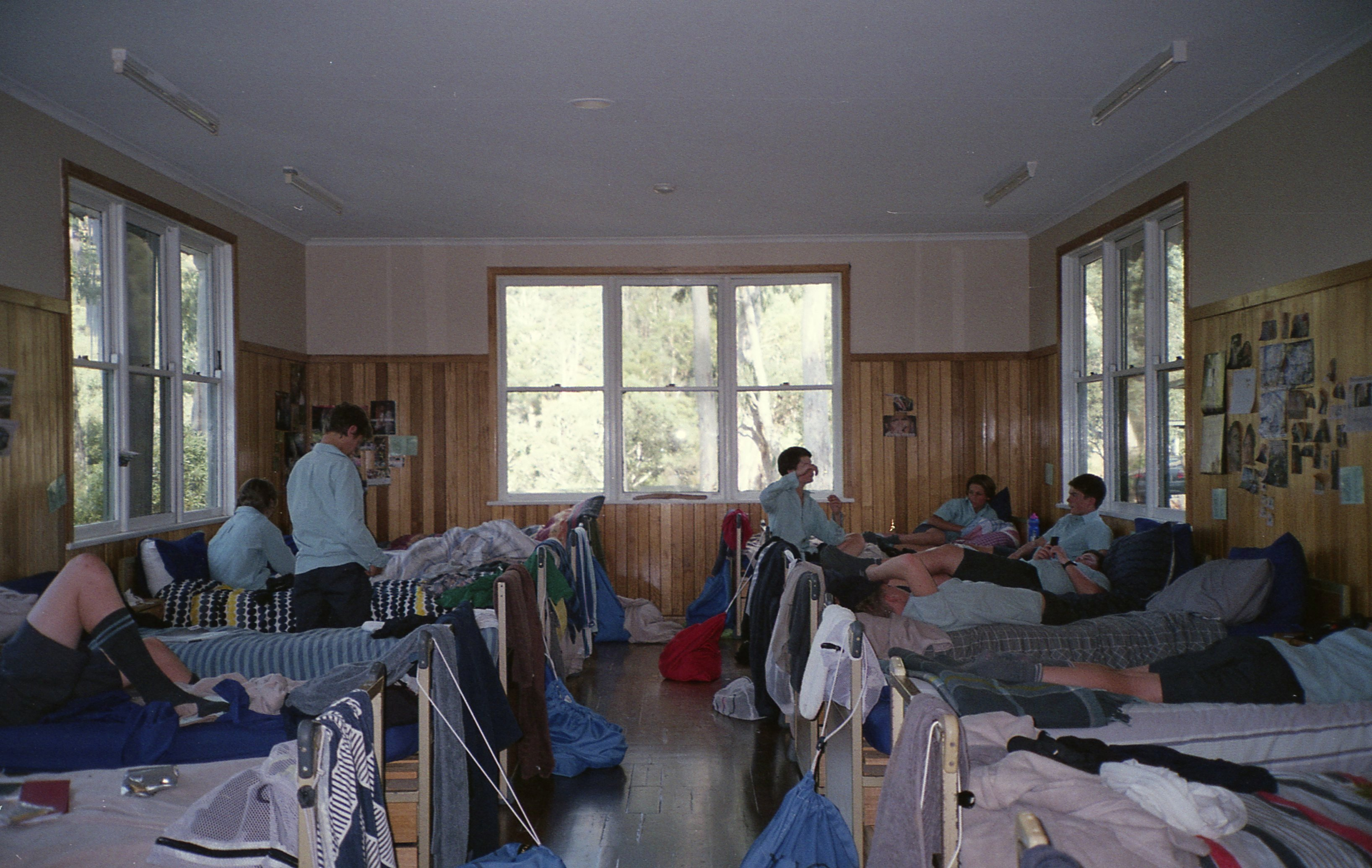
The dormitory of a Timbertop Unit

All students at Timbertop are placed in units of 14–16 people. Boys units are named A through to H, and Girls units are named I through to P, making a total of 16 units. There are both "new" and "old" units; "old" units were constructed by students in the 1950s through to the 1970s while "new" units have been slowly replacing the older buildings since 2009. As of 2021, Old units include A, B, C, E, F, H, L, M, N and O, while new units include D, G, I, J, K and P. Students sleep, clean, study, maintain, and live in their units for the year. Once a week, units perform a "Sunday inspection", which actually occur on a Tuesday despite the name. During the inspection, every part of the unit is cleaned to a high standard and inspected by the unit's Head of Unit. Additionally, students perform two inspections per normal day to maintain cleanliness and hygiene in the unit.

The units are divided into two "Schools": A School and B School. The units that compose the two schools vary by year, and as of 2021, A School is made up of A, D, E, F, I, J, K and O units, with B School being B, C, G, H, L, M, N and P units. The two schools are always completely separate classes, and elective subjects in one school take place whilst the other has core subjects.

When old unit buildings are replaced with new buildings, they are simply converted for other functions instead of being demolished and rebuilt, with replacements built elsewhere (the notable exception is G unit, which was rebuilt). In fact, many classrooms on the Timbertop campus are former unit buildings which had been relocated into new buildings.

As of 2020, the I Unit nameplate has been reallocated to a new girl's unit which was built by the end of 2019. Previously there were 9 Boys units and 7 Girls units; A through I and J through P respectively. New units also have a 16-person capacity. This reallocation was done to increase capacity for girls while maintaining capacity for boys in the long-term, and to create a 50/50 split between genders in the school.

=== Assistants ===
Timbertop offers a gap year programme. Assistants, known as "gappies" (singular "gappy" or "gappie") help with tasks such as co-ordinating activities, organising skiing, helping around the farm, supervising hiking groups and assisting staff in classes, among many other things. Other than former alumni, gappies typically hail from regional Australia or the United Kingdom, but the campus has seen people from countries such as France, Germany, Canada, Japan, and others.

== Features and buildings ==
Notable features on the campus include:

=== Agriculture Centre ===
The Agriculture Centre was established in the late 1980s and primarily deals with cattle and sheep. The large paddocks at the entrance of the school, as well as a small parcel of land on the opposite side of Mount Buller Road, are reserved for grazing. The Agriculture Centre proper consists of several small sheds and pens, as well as an octangular-shaped classroom, reserved for students studying agriculture. Many of the buses that transport students to and from drop-off/pick-up points on their hiking journeys meet in the vicinity of this area.

=== Bald Hill ===
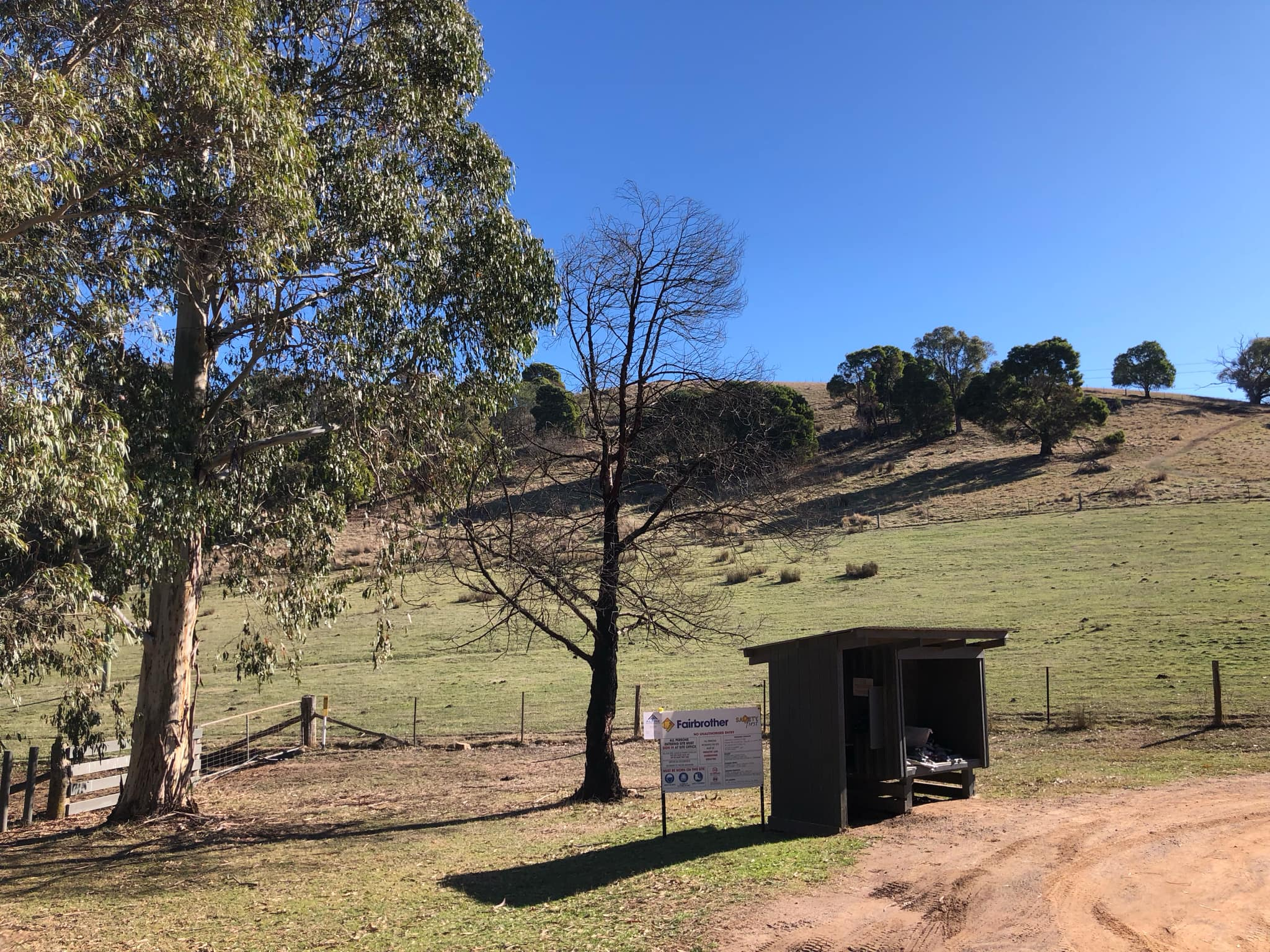
View of Bald Hill from the Main Gate of Timbertop (note the Bald Hill Face Track to the right)

Owing its name to its largely-cleared summit, Bald Hill is 644 metres in height. It is at the intersection of several frequented running routes, including Wild Dog Road (a public, unsealed road along the western approach to the hill), Blackberry Spur, which protrudes down the hill toward Mount Buller Road, and the Bald Hill Switchbacks/Face Tracks.

=== Barclays Hill ===
Formerly known as "Sheepskull Hill", Barclays Hill, at a height of 610 metres, is the closest hill to the entrance of the school. Students also run up this hill, and the summit is marked by a small fireplace. From the eastern face, the Gravel Pits track cuts along the perimeter of the campus boundary, where students must cross a wooden stile that leads them off the campus, where they reach a quarry. This region, whilst not on the campus boundary, is located at the base of Ruby's Knoll, a small hill upon which many orienteering challenges take place.

=== B Unit Flat ===
B Unit Flat is a tract of flat ground on the side of the Timbertop Creek. It gets its name from B Unit, which is the closest unit to this flat area. This space is typically reserved for camping in the earlier months of the year.

=== Chapel of Saint John the Baptist ===
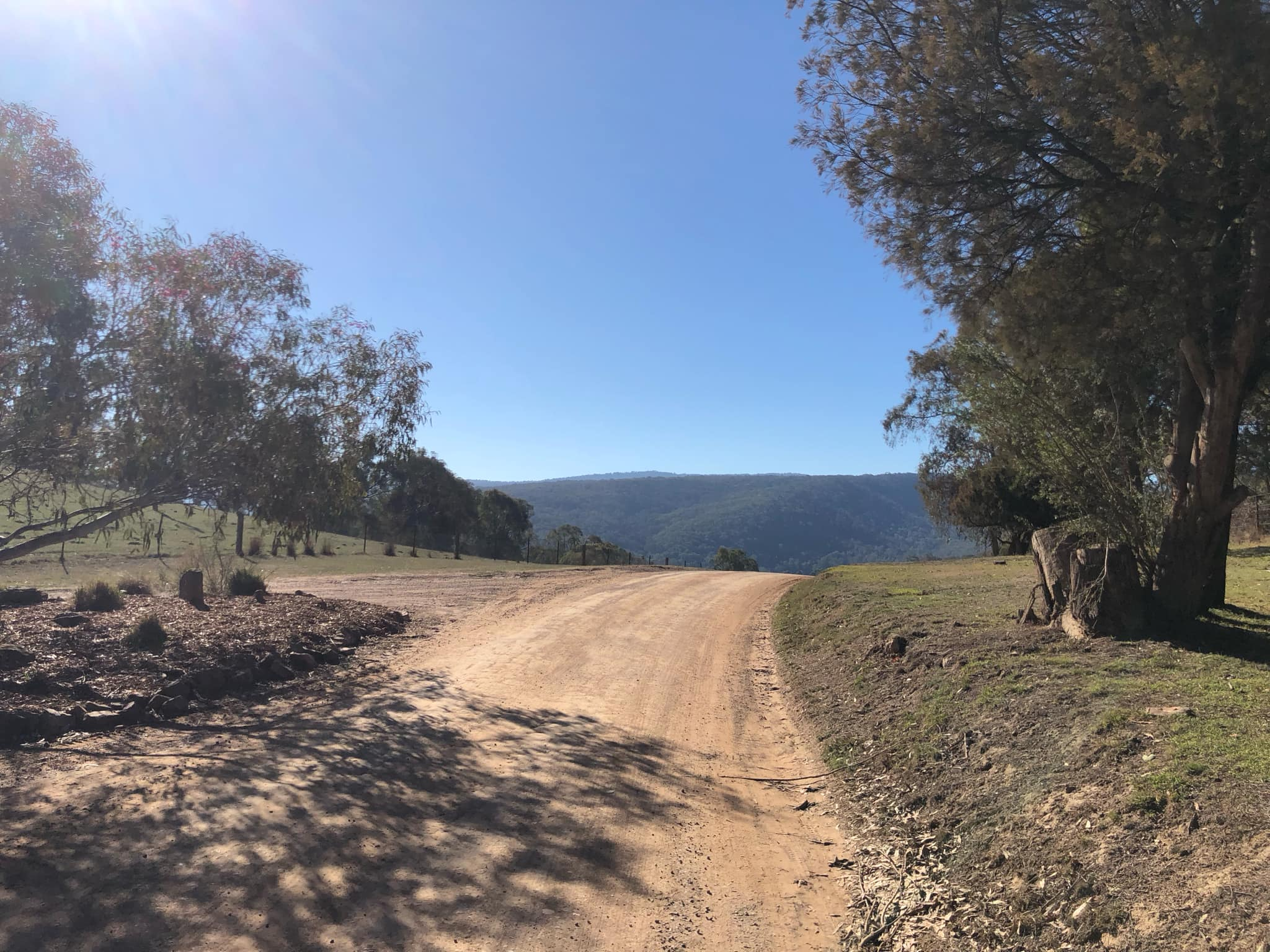
Buttercup Ridge as seen from the Main Gate of Timbertop

Built in stages by staff and students in 1958, the Chapel is host to several services each week. A bell adjacent to the Chapel is rung out, which can be heard across most of the school, to signal that a service or communion is starting. The funds for the Chapel were gifted by Mrs Margaret McWhae, who lived at 'Ellingerrin', a large pastoral property in the Western District of Victoria. Almost all of the materials used in the construction of the Chapel were sourced locally, with the sand and gravel coming from the nearby Delatite River, the stone from the school grounds used for the wing walls and the main altar, and the stone paving around the sanctuary taken from a nearby property bordering the Timbertop Creek that was owned by the Lovick family, another prominent family in the region. The only materials that were imported were the six beams which originated in Oregon. The Chapel's drawcard is a large triangular window, located behind the altar, which faces out toward the surrounding hills, with views extending across to Buttercup Ridge and the Glenroy Hills. As well as visiting guests and speakers, the chapel has seen weddings and funerals.

=== Country Club ===
The 'Country Club' is the name given to a large flat section of ground located on the banks of the Timbertop Creek, where sports lessons typically take place. The Country Club has a basketball/netball court, and several fire pits.

=== Darling Huts ===
The Darling Huts, between Scrubby Hill and Barclays Hill, are three huts: a timber slab dining hut, an accommodation hut and a mud-brick toilet block. The huts, which do not have electricity, allow students to stay overnight and learn about the flora and fauna on and around the campus. Students also get to cook pizzas and other meals.

=== Dining hall ===
Both the dining hall and the accompanying Amphitheatre are the central meeting points of the school. Students must assemble there at least three times a day, for breakfast, lunch and dinner, and must arrive on time. Failure to do so results in a small punishment run known as a "woodshed", where students must run from the dining hall down the hill to a large woodshed, where almost all of the school's wood is stored, and then run up the hill. The dining hall's large verandah boasts picturesque views of the surrounding hills and maintains an imposing location being one of the first buildings of Timbertop seen on the drive into the school. At the end of mealtimes, a bell is rung by one of the teachers and everyone must pause eating and drinking and listen to news and information given by staff. Part of the dining h includes the mail room where incoming mail and newspapers are sorted and dispersed across the school. A select number of students from each unit, must take on the role of a dishwasher/cleaner, also known as a "slushie", at the end of each meal. Their job on "slush" duty is replaced weekly.

=== John Lewis Centre ===
The John Lewis Centre, or JLC, is a semi-underground set of three classrooms that can combine into one room. This one room, encased with concrete, acts as a bunker to protect from bushfires, essentially acting as a "last resort" should evacuation be impossible. The bunker was opened in 2011 as a response to previous bushfires which had managed to reach school grounds, including in 2006 and 2009.

=== Klingsporn Track ===
Named after the previous family that owned the land that currently constitutes Timbertop, this track runs parallel with Grammar School Road, the main thoroughfare in and out of the school. The track is arguably more utilised than Grammar School Road due its use in several running and hiking routes. Additionally, Klingsporn Track makes a feature in the route of "Buller Road", a punishment run issued to select misbehaving students.

=== Scrubby Hill ===
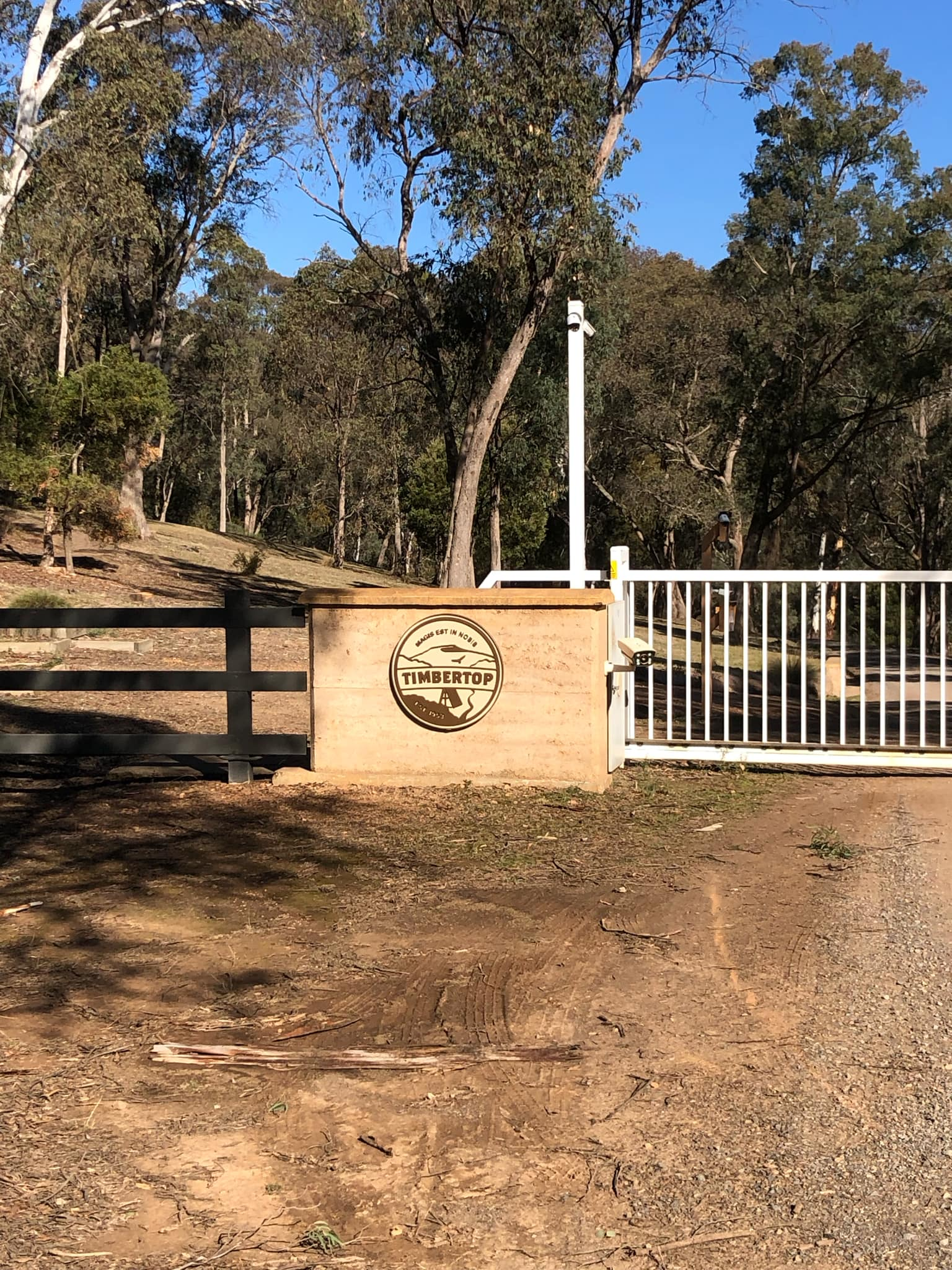
Main gate of Timbertop

The geographically central part of the campus, Scrubby Hill at 652 metres, is completely covered in vegetation. The hill is cut in half by the fire break which reaches across from the main gate toward Klingsporn Track. The hill is often included in runs in Term 1, as a particular section of the route that has a steep set of stairs is often deemed to be grueling by the new and unprepared students. Another prominent running route skirts around the western/northern side of the hill, where the track leads to Five Ways, an intersection where a track splinters off toward Darling Huts and another leads to Barclays Hill. A small clearing on the eastern side of the hill is known as the "Veggie Tip".

=== Swimming/Drinking Dams ===
At the rear of the school lie two dams, the Swimming Dam (Bottom Dam), and the Drinking Water Dam (Top Dam). Almost all of the school's drinking supply originates from the Drinking Dam, where it is treated with UV, and transported around the school. The Swimming Dam is often used in the warmer months for sports lessons and a swimming test, but is also home to the "Head of the Dam", a parody of the Head of the River, a large rowing event held in Victoria and other states in Australia, of which Geelong Grammar School takes part. Pool doughnuts are assembled and taped together in such a way to resemble a rowing boat, and students, using their arms as oars, must paddle from one side of the river to the other in a race.

=== Timbertop Creek ===
Flowing directly through the middle of the campus, Timbertop Creek begins near the summit of Mount Timbertop, flows down Rhyolite Falls, before it passes through campus, where it reaches Monty's Weir, then onward through B Unit Flat, the Country Club, the base of Bald Hill and finally converges with the Delatite River off-campus near the township of Merrijig. The creek typically flows at its strongest in late winter/early spring as a result of snowmelt from further upstream.

=== Vineyard ===
Timbertop is home to a small vineyard which was planted in the late 1980s. The vineyard, owned by Ross Ritchie Wines, produces red wines including nebbiolo and merlot. Students who undertake agriculture, particularly viticulture, take part in the grape treading process and other wine-making processes.

== Notable people ==
In 1966, Prince Charles (now King Charles III) attended Timbertop for six months. This was widely publicised at the time. In 1973, Prince Charles said that his time at Timbertop was the most enjoyable part of his whole education.

In 1983, the former UK prime minister Boris Johnson took a gap year as a teaching assistant at Timbertop.

In 1998, the musician Missy Higgins attended Timbertop in M Unit, where she wrote the song "All for Believing". In 2001, the song won the Triple J Unearthed competition. She wrote the lyrics of the song inside the roof of her unit.

In the late 1980s, writer John Marsden worked at Timbertop as head of English. While there, he made the decision to write for teenagers, following his dissatisfaction with his students' apathy towards reading, or the observation that teenagers simply weren't reading any more. Marsden then wrote So Much to Tell You in only three weeks and was published in 1987. The book was a best seller and won numerous awards including "Book of the Year" from the Children's Book Council of Australia (CBCA).

== See also ==
- Gordonstoun
