= Delatite River =

Delatite Devil's
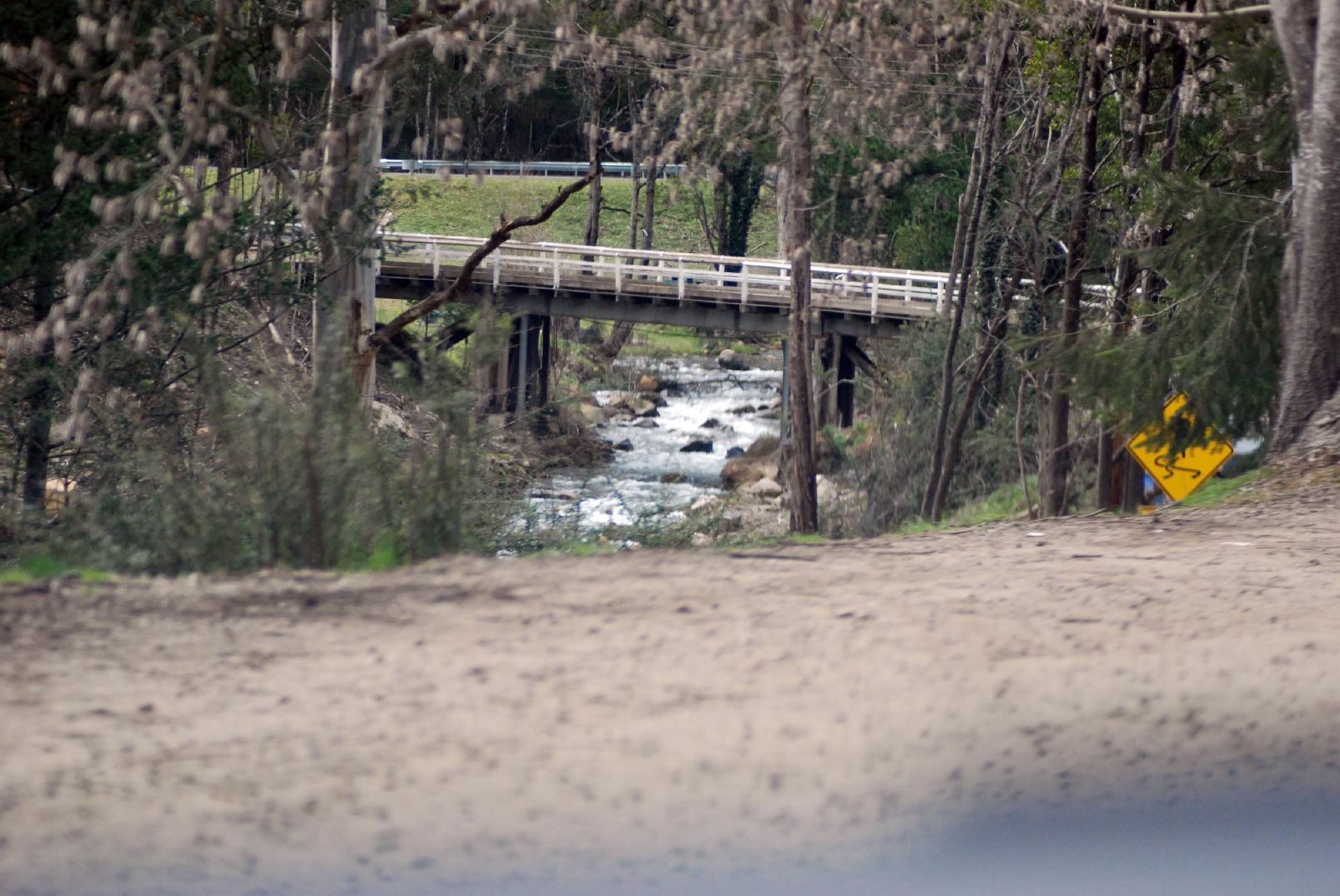
- Delatite River near Mirimbah

- Location of the Delatite River mouth in Victoria
- Etymology: Aboriginal Taungurung: derived from Beolite
- Native name: Wappang, Callathera, Kalylatherer, Kay-lath-er-rer, Pappang, Wapping

Location
- Country: Australia
- State: Victoria
- Region: South Eastern Highlands bioregion (IBRA), Northern Country/North Central
- Local government area: Mansfield
- Towns: Merrijig

Physical characteristics
- Source: Victorian Alps, Great Dividing Range
  - location: between Mount Stirling and Mount Buller
  - coordinates: 37°08′39.5″S 146°29′43″E
  - elevation: 1,490 m (4,890 ft)
- Mouth: confluence with the Goulburn River
  - location: Lake Eildon
  - coordinates: 37°10′3″S 145°59′57″E
  - elevation: 260 m (850 ft)
- Length: 85 km (53 mi)

Basin features
- River system: Goulburn Broken catchment, Murray-Darling basin
- Tributaries
  - left: Lanky Creek
  - right: Plain Creek, Stony Creek (Delatite River), Devil Plain Creek, River Creek, Howes Creek, Burnt Creek, Ford Creek, Brankeet Creek
- National park: Lake Eildon National Park

The Delatite River, an inland perennial river of the Goulburn Broken catchment, part of the Murray-Darling basin, is located in the lower South Eastern Highlands bioregion and Northern Country/North Central regions of the Australian state of Victoria. The headwaters of the Delatite River rise on the western slopes of the Victorian Alps and descend to flow into the Goulburn River within Lake Eildon.

== Location and features ==
The Delatite River rises in Howqua Gap, between the ski resort mountains of Mount Stirling and Mount Buller, of the Great Dividing Range. The river flows generally westwards, initially through rugged national park and state forests and, as the river descends, through more open woodlands. The river is joined by nine tributaries, passing north of the town of Merrijig before reaching its confluence in Lake Eildon, an impoundment formed on the Goulburn and Delatite rivers, just east of Eildon. The river descends 1,230 metres (4,040 ft) over its 85-kilometre (53 mi) course.

== Etymology ==
In Australian Aboriginal languages, the river is variously named Wappang, Callathera, Kalylatherer or Kay-lath-er-rer, Pappang, and Wapping with no defined meanings for each of the words.

The name of the river is derived from the name of the wife of a former local indigenous leader Beolite, the leader of the yowung-illum-baluks of the Taungurung people, in the Taungurung language.

== See also ==
- List of rivers of Australia § Victoria
