= Mount Stirling =

Mountain in Victoria, Australia

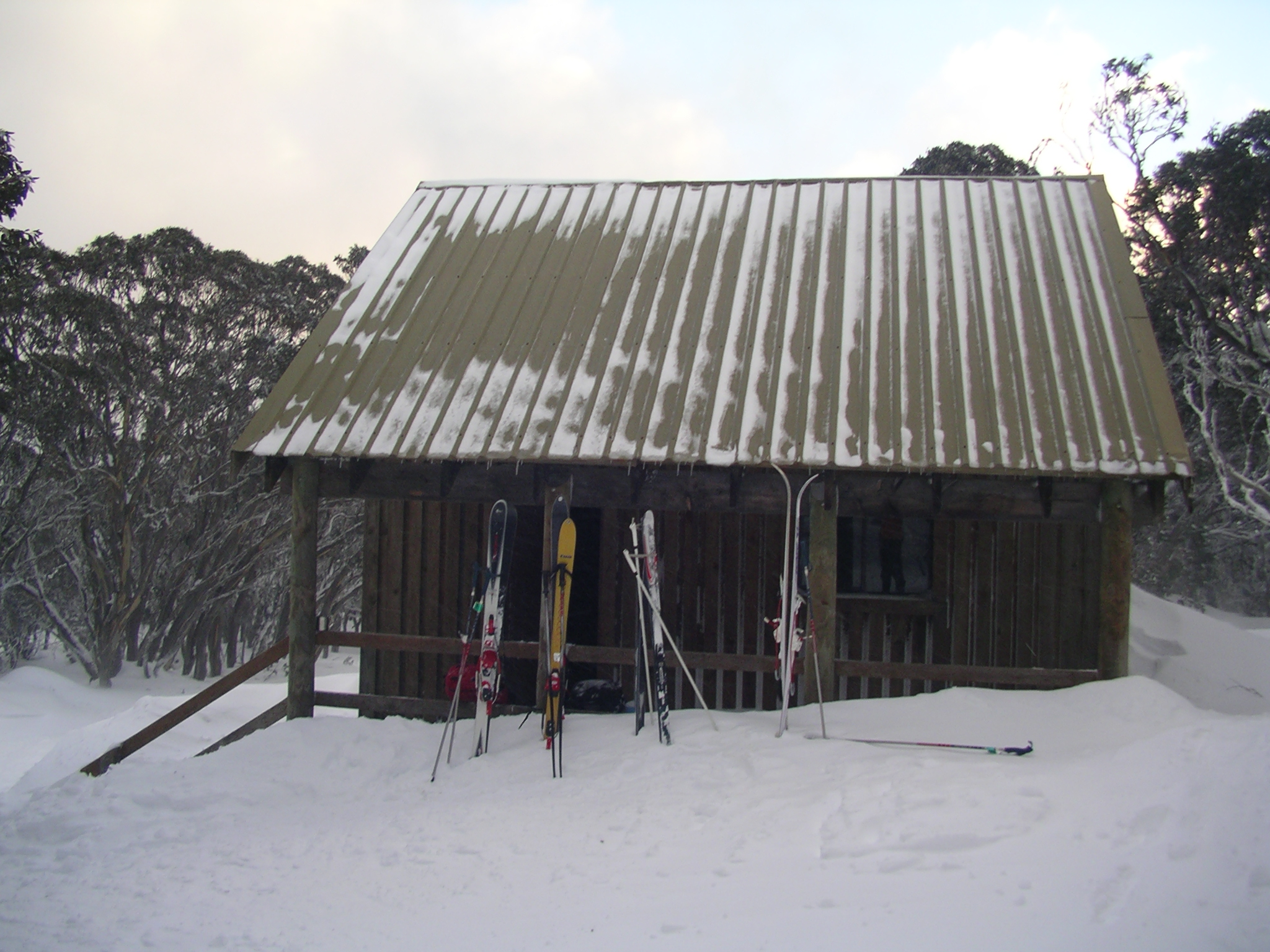
- The Bluff Spur Hut at Mount Stirling

Highest point
- Elevation: 1,747 m (5,732 ft) AHD
- Coordinates: 37°07′S 146°31′E

Geography
- Location within Shire of Mansfield
- Location: Victoria, Australia
- Parent range: Great Dividing Range

Climbing
- First ascent: Unknown
- Easiest route: Hike/ski/4WD

Mount Stirling is a mountain in the Victorian Alps of the Great Dividing Range, located in the Hume region of Victoria, Australia. The mountain has an elevation of 1,747–1,749 metres (5,732–5,738 ft) above sea level.

Mount Stirling is entirely located within the Mount Stirling Alpine Resort, a cross-country and backcountry ski resort located on the slopes of the mountain and situated approximately 230 kilometres (140 mi) from Melbourne. The Mount Stirling ski resort is a popular location for beginner backcountry skiers and snowboarders due to its distance from Melbourne and proximity to the Mount Buller Alpine Resort. As at the 2011 census, the area had a population of 36.

The Mount Stirling Alpine Resort is contained within an 2,820-hectare (7,000-acre) unincorporated area under the direct administration of the government of Victoria, and is surrounded by the Shire of Mansfield.

Mount Stirling was named in honour of James Stirling, a surveyor and later, the Victorian Government Geologist.

== Location and features ==
The mountain and ski resort are located at the head of the Delatite River, which flows westwards. It is surrounded by the Stirling Circuit Road, which provides access to mountains further into the Victorian Alps. In winter the road is closed at Telephone Box Junction, from which it is generally possible to ski to reach the summit (depending on conditions it is sometimes necessary to walk the lower section).

The mountain has views across to nearby Mount Buller as well as the high range that runs from Mount Cobbler through Mount Speculation and the Cross cut Saw and Mount Howitt. From there the range swings westwards, finishing in The Bluff, a plateau that has large clifflines on its northern side.

The lower reaches of the mountain are dominated by Alpine Ash forests, which merge into Snowgum Woodlands above approximately 1,400 metres (4,600 ft). There is a small part of the summit area which sits above treeline.

=== Huts ===
There are a number of huts in the area of Mount Stirling providing emergency refuge to visitors:

- Bluff Spur Hut is a shelter hut near the summit erected as a memorial to a pair of skiers who died of exposure on the mountain.
- Kingsaddle Shelter, an open shelter amidst towering Alpine Ash.
- Howqua Gap Hut was moved around Mount Stirling for loggers to shelter in and was left at the bottom of the Howqua Gap trail.
- Geelong Grammar School Hut on the other side of the summit from Bluff Spur Hut is owned by Geelong Grammar School and is used during cross country skiing by students from the Timbertop campus.
- Craig's Hut in the Clear Hills, built as a set for the film, The Man from Snowy River, was destroyed on 11 December 2006 by the Eastern Victoria Great Divide bushfires; and has since been rebuilt.
- Mount No 3 Refuge Hut, rebuilt in 2007
- Bus Hut on the Mount Number 3 Road

== Seasonal activities ==
In winter the area is a patrolled cross country and back country ski resort. Maps of ski trails are available at the entry gate.

In summer the area is popular with four wheel drivers and bush walkers. The trail from the Circuit Road to the summit takes less than two hours to walk and is popular for day and over night trips. Also, when it is not snowing or in danger of bushfires, the area is used by numerous educational groups.

== See also ==
- Alpine National Park
- List of mountains in Australia § Victoria
- Skiing in Victoria
