= Taponga River =

Taponga Wild Dog
- Location of the Taponga River mouth in Victoria
- Etymology: Taungurung: tap, meaning bronzewing pigeon

Location
- Country: Australia
- State: Victoria
- Region: South Eastern Highlands bioregion (IBRA), Victorian Alps, Northern Country/North Central
- Local government area: Murrindindi Shire

Physical characteristics
- Source: Victorian Alps, Great Dividing Range
  - location: below Rough Hill
  - coordinates: 37°27′35″S 145°58′35″E
  - elevation: 837 m (2,746 ft)
- Mouth: confluence with the Big River
  - location: southeast of Eildon
  - coordinates: 37°22′4″S 146°3′30″E
  - elevation: 316 m (1,037 ft)
- Length: 15 km (9.3 mi)

Basin features
- River system: Goulburn Broken catchment, Murray-Darling basin

The Taponga River, an inland perennial river of the Goulburn Broken catchment, part of the Murray-Darling basin, is located in the lower South Eastern Highlands bioregion, Alpine and Northern Country/North Central regions of the Australian state of Victoria. It flows from the northwestern slopes of the Australian Alps, north and joins with the Big River.

== Course ==
The Taponga River rises below Rough Hill, part of the Great Dividing Range and the river flows generally north by east through the Big River State Forest, joined by four minor tributaries before reaching its confluence with the Big River south of Eildon. The river descends 521 metres (1,709 ft) over its 15-kilometre (9.3 mi) course.

== Etymology ==
The name of the river is derived from the Aboriginal Taungurung word tap, meaning a bronzewing pigeon. The river has variously been called the Wild Dog River and the Right Hand Branch of the Big River.

== Recreation ==
The river is popular for fishing, with abundant rainbow trout to 220 grams (7.8 oz) and a few large brown trout in the period from April to June. There are usually some small river blackfish.

A camping area is available, approximately 19 kilometres (12 mi) east of Marysville on the Eildon–Jamieson Road or the Big River State Forest Road. There is no booking system for the camp site.

== See also ==
- List of rivers of Australia § Victoria
