= Big River (Goulburn River, Victoria) =

Big
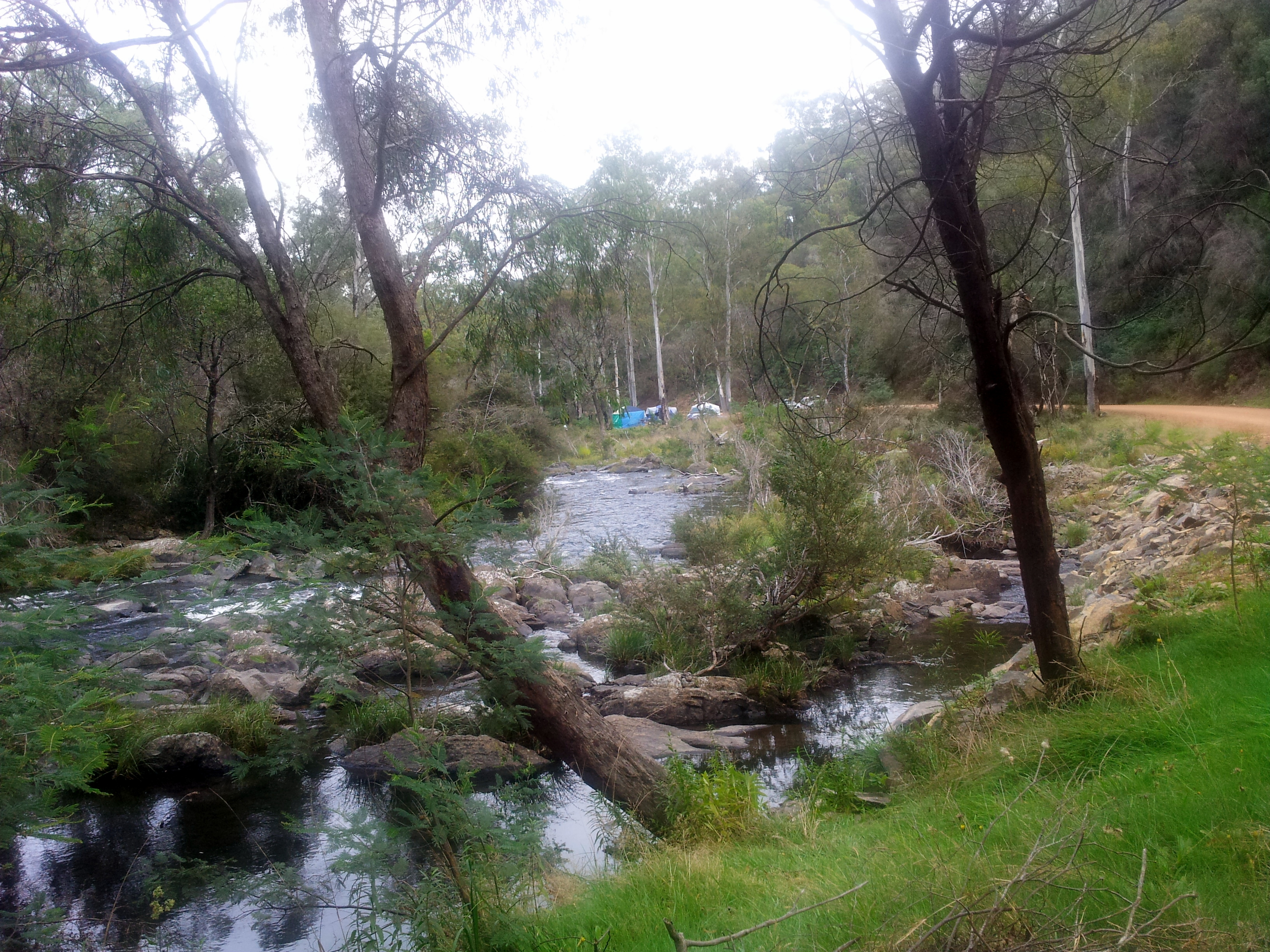
- A campsite on the Big River Road, southwest of Jamieson

- Location of the Big River mouth in Victoria

Location
- Country: Australia
- State: Victoria
- Region: South Eastern Highlands (IBRA), Northern Country/North Central
- Local government area: Mansfield

Physical characteristics
- Source: Yarra Ranges, Great Dividing Range
- Source confluence: Springs Creek and Oaks Creek
  - location: remote state forestry land
  - coordinates: 37°36′25″S 146°01′51″E
  - elevation: 608 m (1,995 ft)
- Mouth: confluence with the Goulburn River
  - location: Lake Eildon
  - coordinates: 37°18′54″S 146°02′59″E
  - elevation: 260 m (850 ft)
- Length: 62 km (39 mi)

Basin features
- River system: Goulburn Broken catchment, Murray-Darling basin
- Tributaries
  - left: Torbreck River, Taponga River
- National park: Lake Eildon National Park

The Big River, an inland perennial river of the Goulburn Broken catchment, part of the Murray-Darling basin, is located in the lower South Eastern Highlands bioregion and Northern Country/North Central regions of the Australian state of Victoria. The headwaters of the Big River rise on the northern slopes of the Yarra Ranges and descend to flow into the Goulburn River within Lake Eildon.

== Location and features ==
Formed by the confluence of the Springs and Oaks Creeks, the Big River rises in remote state forestry country on the northern slopes of the Yarra Ranges, part of the Great Dividing Range. The river flows generally north, through rugged national park and state forests as the river descends, joined by thirteen tributaries including the Torbreck River and the Taponga River, before reaching its confluence with the Goulburn River within the impounded Lake Eildon, located in the Lake Eildon National Park. The river descends 349 metres (1,145 ft) over its 62-kilometre (39 mi) course.

== See also ==
- List of rivers of Australia § Victoria
