= Eildon Pondage Power Station =

- Country: Australia
- Location: Victorian Alps, Victoria
- Coordinates: 37°14′35″S 145°53′51″E
- Status: Operational
- Construction began: 1994
- Opening date: 1995
- Construction cost: A$14 million
- Owner(s): Pacific Blue

Lower reservoir
- Creates: Eildon Pondage
- Total capacity: 5,200 ML (1,100×10^{6} imp gal; 1,400×10^{6} US gal)

Power Station
- Installed capacity: 4.5 MW (6,000 hp)

The Eildon Pondage Power Station is a hydroelectric power station on the Eildon Pondage at Lake Eildon, Victoria, Australia. Eildon Pondage has one turbo generator, with a total generating capacity of 4.5 megawatts (6,000 hp) of electricity. It is owned and operated by Pacific Blue, and the electricity produced is sold to electricity retailer TXU.

Eildon Pondage re-uses the water from Eildon Power Station, which is stored in the pondage to ensure a controlled release into the Goulburn River downstream from Lake Eildon.

== See also ==
- List of power stations in Victoria (Australia)
- Eildon Hydroelectric Power Station
