= Eildon Dam =

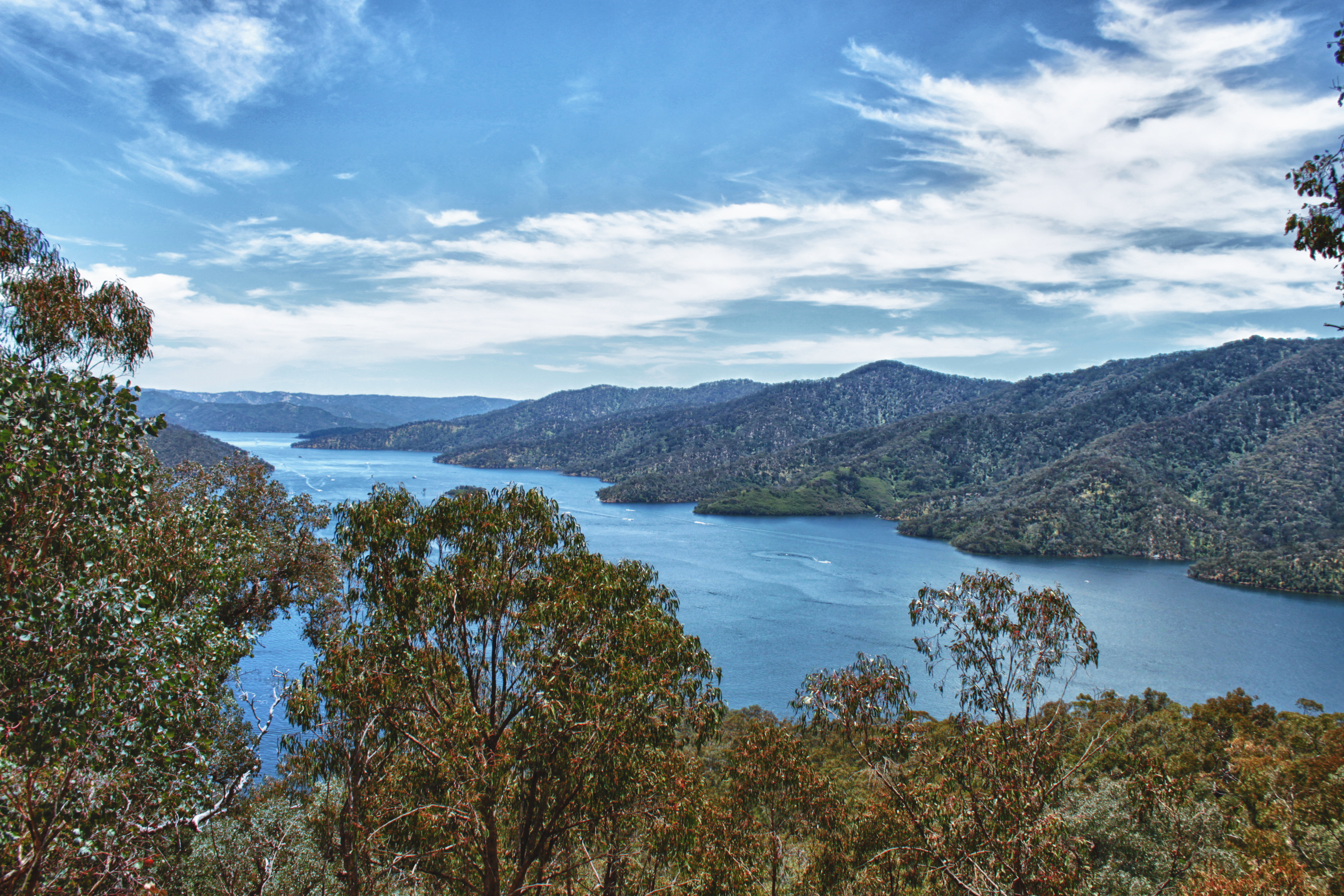
- The reservoir, 2011

- Location of the dam in Victoria
- Interactive map of Eildon Dam
- Country: Australia
- Location: Victorian Alps, Victoria
- Coordinates: 37°13′20″S 145°55′33″E
- Purpose: Water supply; Irrigation; Hydroelectricity
- Status: Operational
- Construction began: 1915
- Opening date: 1929; 1935 (modifications); 1955 (enlarged)
- Operator: Goulburn–Murray Water

Dam and spillways
- Type of dam: Embankment dam
- Impounds: Goulburn River
- Height: 84.5 m (277 ft)
- Length: 1,085 m (3,560 ft)
- Dam volume: 10,200×10^{3} m^{3} (360×10^{6} cu ft)
- Spillway type: Controlled
- Spillway capacity: 3,356 cubic metres per second (118,500 cu ft/s)

Reservoir
- Creates: Lake Eildon
- Total capacity: 3,390 GL (2,750,000 acre⋅ft)
- Catchment area: 3,885 km^{2} (1,500 sq mi)
- Surface area: 13,832 ha (34,180 acres)
- Maximum water depth: 79 m (259 ft)
- Normal elevation: 288.9 m (948 ft) AHD

Eildon Hydroelectric Power Station
- Coordinates: 37°13′19″S 145°55′17″E
- Operator: AGL Energy
- Commission date: 1955; 2001 (upgrade)
- Turbines: 4 x 60 MW (80,000 hp); 2 x 7.5 MW (10,100 hp)
- Installed capacity: 135 MW (181,000 hp)
- Annual generation: 226 GWh (810 TJ)
- Website g-mwater.com.au

The Eildon Dam is an embankment dam across the Goulburn River, located in the Alpine region of Victoria, Australia. The dam is situated between the regional towns of Mansfield and Eildon within Lake Eildon National Park. Built between 1915 and 1929, with subsequent modifications, the purpose of the dam is for potable water supply, irrigation, and the generation of hydroelectricity. The impounded reservoir is called Lake Eildon.

== Dam and reservoir overview ==
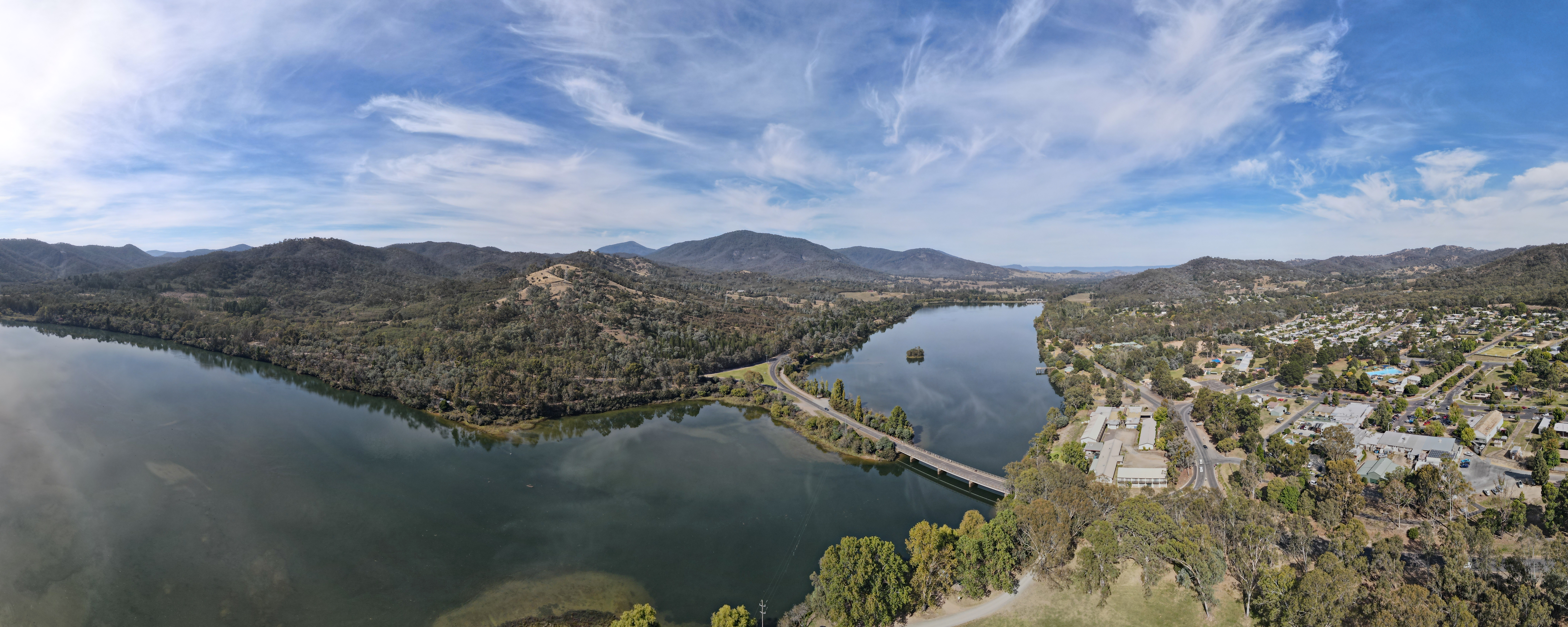
Lake Eildon National Park from above. March 2021.

=== Dam ===
The inaugural structure was called the Eldon Weir and was designed by the State Rivers and Water Supply Commission of Victoria and was completed between 1915 and 1929 to provide irrigation water for what was a vast uncultivated area on Victoria's northern plains. The first cut of ground was done by Mr Bain and Mr MacLean from Scotland.

The original water storage was known as the Sugarloaf Reservoir. The weir was modified in 1929 and again in 1935, to increase the storage capacity to 377 gigalitres (306,000 acre⋅ft). However, the reservoir did not meet the growing demand for water in the Goulburn Valley and provide adequate protection for farmers during drought years. Following a detailed feasibility study of all possible storage sites on the Goulburn River, it was decided that the existing dam site was suitable for construction of a larger dam. In 1951, work began to enlarge the storage to its present capacity. The enlargement was completed in 1955 and the storage was renamed Lake Eildon.

The rock and earth-fill embankment dam wall is 83 metres (272 ft) high and 983 metres (3,225 ft) long. The core component materials of the wall include 10,200 thousand cubic metres (360×10^{6} cu ft) of rock and earth. When full, the reservoir has a capacity of 3,390 gigalitres (2,750,000 acre⋅ft) with an average depth of 24 metres (79 ft), covers an area of 13,832 hectares (34,180 acres), drawn from a catchment area of 3,885 square kilometres (1,500 sq mi) that includes the Goulburn, Delatite, Howqua, Big, and Jamieson rivers and several minor tributaries, The 1,085-metre-long (3,560 ft) controlled spillway and its crest is 288.9 metres (948 ft) AHD, and can release a maximum outflow of approximately 3,356 cubic metres per second (118,500 cu ft/s).

=== Reservoir ===
Lake Eildon is connected to the metropolitan water supply of Melbourne via the North-South Pipeline from the Goulburn River. On average, 91% of the water from Lake Eildon goes to the Goulburn Weir and the Waranga Basin before it flows to irrigators in the Goulburn Valley system.

==== Recreation ====
As the only inland waterway where houseboats are permitted, Lake Eildon has a thriving houseboat culture with over 700 on the lake. A public harbour provides access to houseboat rental and some boats are restricted to daytime operation due to lack of lighting. A private harbour manages the owners' houseboats with staff and facilities that cater to over 18 marinas. Both harbours provide fueling facilities.

The Eildon Weir Football Club won the 1928 Weir / Molesworth Football Association premiership, which was played at Alexandra against Yarck.In 1930, Eildon Weir defeated Alexandra Seconds by 32 points in the Upper Goulburn Junior Football Association grand final played on the Weir ground.

==== In popular culture ====
The nearby town of Bonnie Doon was the location for the holiday scenes in the movie, The Castle. Lake Eildon was also the main location used for the 1975 feature film version of The Box, as well as the 1989 direct-to-video Australian horror film Houseboat Horror.

Lake Eldon was a site of the religious cult, The Family, where adult members kept children in seclusion and home-schooled them from the 1960s to 1980s, amid subsequent and unproven allegations of child abuse.

== Hydroelectric power station ==
The Eildon Hydroelectric Power Station is a conventional hydroelectric power station, owned by AGL Energy, that operates during the irrigation season from August to May. Mainly governed by the release of water to meet irrigation demands, the power station may also be operated during winter and spring when flood releases can be used to generate electricity, and can be used to meet short-term emergency power needs resulting from unscheduled events across the State's power grid.

Initially completed as part of the Sugarloaf Reservoir with just 15 megawatts (20,000 hp) of generating power, capacity was increased by 1957 to 120 megawatts (160,000 hp) through the installation of two 60 megawatts (80,000 hp) turbines. The first 67-megawatt (90,000 hp) turbine was commissioned in 1956, and a second in 1957. In addition, there are two 7.5-megawatt (10,100 hp) turbines; these were decommissioned in 1971 and recommissioned in 2001. These smaller turbines were relocated from the former Sugarloaf Power Station on the Eildon Weir, completed in 1929 and in use until work on the larger dam started in 1951. This renovation of the oldest turbines in 2001 led to a generation capacity of 135 megawatts (181,000 hp).

A 5,200 megalitres (4,200 acre⋅ft) pondage below the dam temporarily detains water discharged from the power station and regulates releases downstream to minimise variations in flow due to intermittent power generation. In 1995 the Eildon Pondage Power Station, a small hydro-electric station with 4.5 megawatts (6,000 hp) output was installed on the pondage. In 2024, AGL studied the options of expanding the scheme with pumped-storage hydroelectricity.

Eildon Power Station has four turbo generators, with a total generating capacity of 150 megawatts (200,000 hp) of electricity. It produces an average of around 225 gigawatt-hours (810 TJ) per annum.

== Climate ==
Lake Eildon is most notable for its extraordinary cloud cover in winter, measuring only 69 sun hours in June; this is especially cloudy for a location at only 37 degrees of latitude. Summers are generally warm and sunny, though with the passage of cold fronts are normally interspersed with much cooler days and nights.

=== Drought and recovery ===
During the drought years in Victoria in the 2000s, Lake Eildon rarely filled and the once-thriving holiday destinations around the lake were unable to attract visitors, leading to considerable economic hardship. Although water is in great demand for agriculture, careful regulation has kept outflows fairly static. During November 2006 the lake dropped to a low of only 15% from the previous year level of 48.3%. The lake reached as low as 5.3% in 2007.

After many years with below average rainfall, 2010 saw Lake Eildon receive above average rainfall and rose from 23% of capacity in May 2010 to be 82.5% as of March 2011. On the night of 13 October 2022, Lake Eildon inflows ranged between 100,000 to 145,000 megalitres (81,000 to 118,000 acre⋅ft) per day, far above the dam's maximum outflow of 38,000 megalitres (31,000 acre⋅ft) per day with the spill gates open. On 15 October 2022, due to an abnormal amount of rain in the region, the lake filled up to 100.3% of its capacity for the first time since 1994. Because the spillway gates were raised, this raised the height of the dam allowing more water into the reservoir than is normally able.

=== Weather box ===
Climate data for Lake Eildon (1970–2025, rainfall to 1887); 230 m AMSL; 37.23° S, 145.91° E
| Month | Jan | Feb | Mar | Apr | May | Jun | Jul | Aug | Sep | Oct | Nov | Dec | Year |
|---|---|---|---|---|---|---|---|---|---|---|---|---|---|
| Record high °C (°F) | 43.3 (109.9) | 45.4 (113.7) | 39.1 (102.4) | 34.1 (93.4) | 26.9 (80.4) | 20.5 (68.9) | 21.0 (69.8) | 24.5 (76.1) | 28.5 (83.3) | 34.2 (93.6) | 38.9 (102.0) | 40.4 (104.7) | 45.4 (113.7) |
| Mean daily maximum °C (°F) | 29.2 (84.6) | 29.1 (84.4) | 25.8 (78.4) | 20.9 (69.6) | 16.1 (61.0) | 12.6 (54.7) | 12.1 (53.8) | 13.7 (56.7) | 16.7 (62.1) | 20.1 (68.2) | 23.7 (74.7) | 26.6 (79.9) | 20.5 (69.0) |
| Mean daily minimum °C (°F) | 12.9 (55.2) | 12.8 (55.0) | 10.7 (51.3) | 7.9 (46.2) | 5.9 (42.6) | 4.1 (39.4) | 3.7 (38.7) | 4.3 (39.7) | 5.7 (42.3) | 7.3 (45.1) | 9.5 (49.1) | 11.2 (52.2) | 8.0 (46.4) |
| Record low °C (°F) | 2.8 (37.0) | 3.2 (37.8) | 2.1 (35.8) | 0.0 (32.0) | −1.8 (28.8) | −3.6 (25.5) | −4.3 (24.3) | −4.1 (24.6) | −1.8 (28.8) | −1.1 (30.0) | 0.7 (33.3) | 2.1 (35.8) | −4.3 (24.3) |
| Average precipitation mm (inches) | 48.8 (1.92) | 42.0 (1.65) | 51.9 (2.04) | 60.3 (2.37) | 78.1 (3.07) | 92.3 (3.63) | 92.7 (3.65) | 98.5 (3.88) | 81.1 (3.19) | 79.2 (3.12) | 67.3 (2.65) | 57.9 (2.28) | 850.4 (33.48) |
| Average precipitation days (≥ 0.2mm) | 5.8 | 5.1 | 6.5 | 8.4 | 12.1 | 14.3 | 16.0 | 16.1 | 13.3 | 11.7 | 9.2 | 7.6 | 126.1 |
| Average afternoon relative humidity (%) | 41 | 40 | 45 | 53 | 66 | 75 | 73 | 65 | 59 | 53 | 48 | 43 | 55 |
| Mean monthly sunshine hours | 269.7 | 245.8 | 226.3 | 177.0 | 108.5 | 69.0 | 77.5 | 114.7 | 156.0 | 220.1 | 234.0 | 244.9 | 2,143.5 |

== Gallery ==
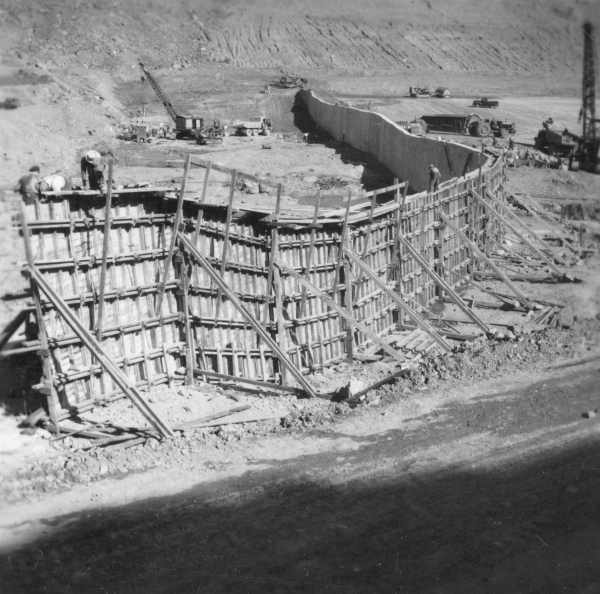
During construction of a new embankment, 1954

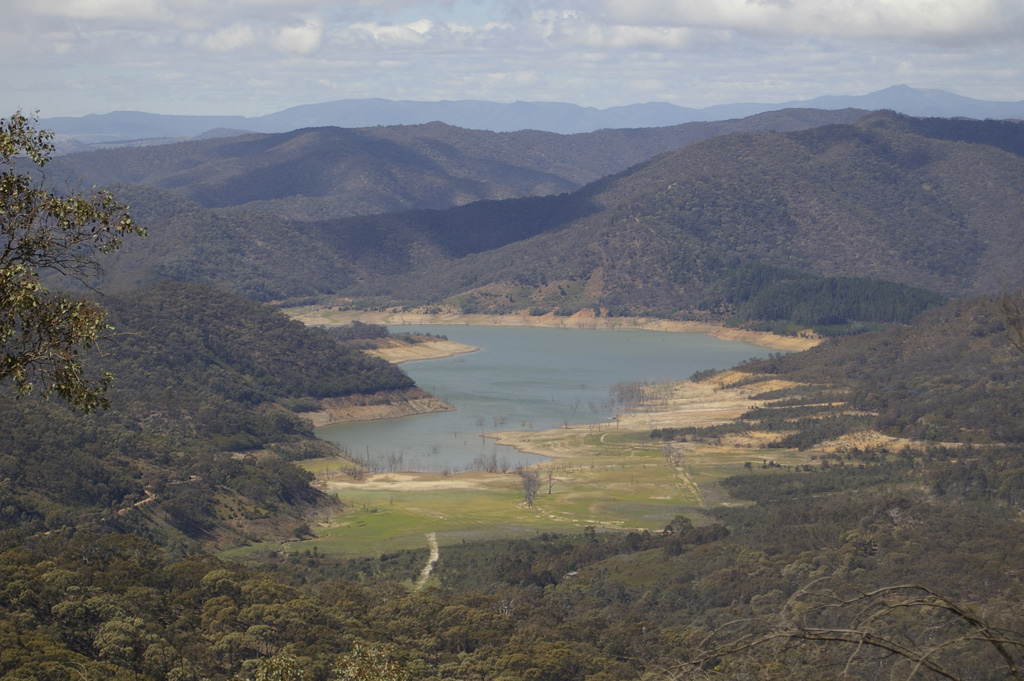
Lake Eildon, c. 2006

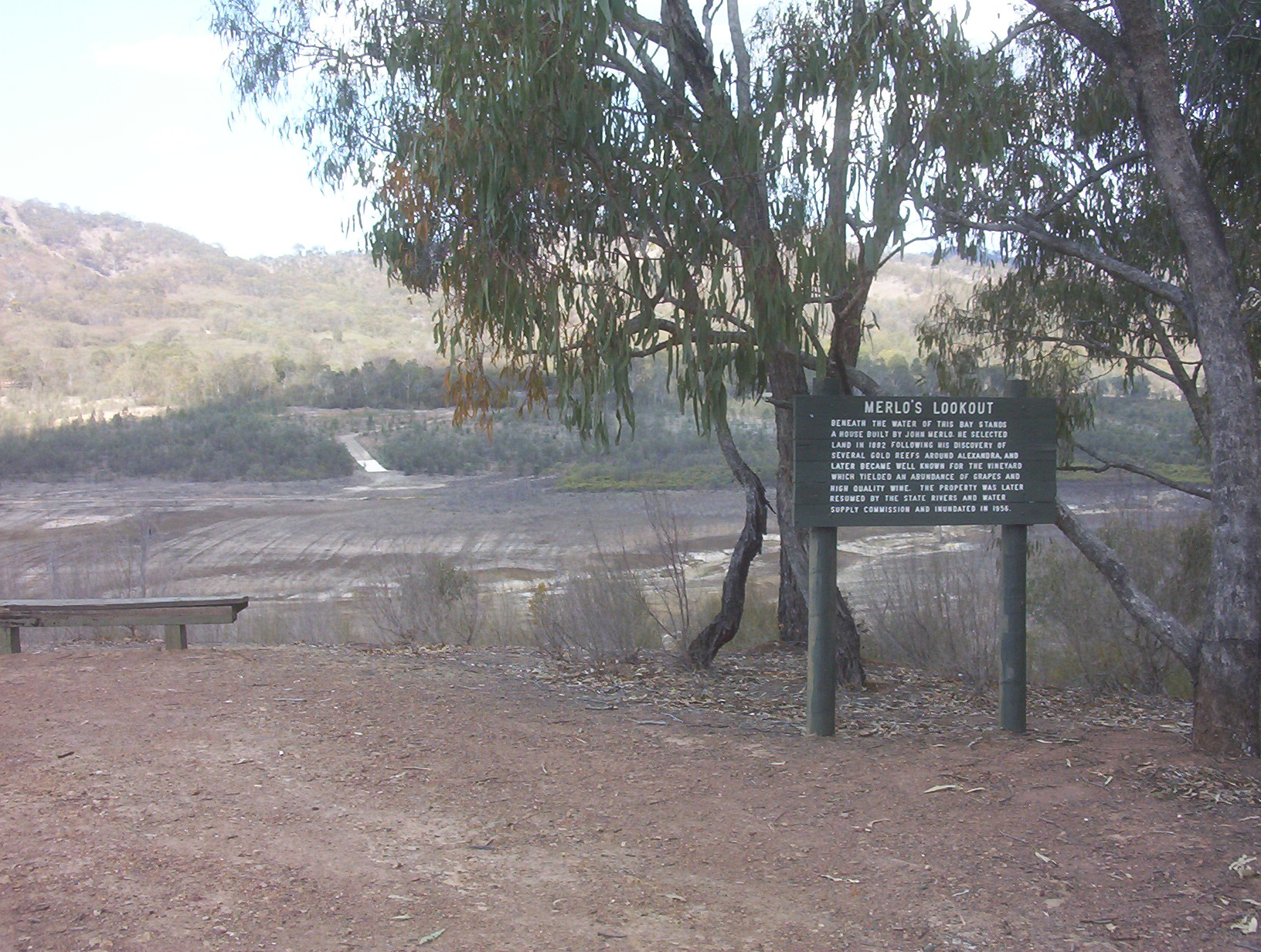
Lake Eildon from Merlo's Lookout in 2007, showing one of the boat ramps clear of the water

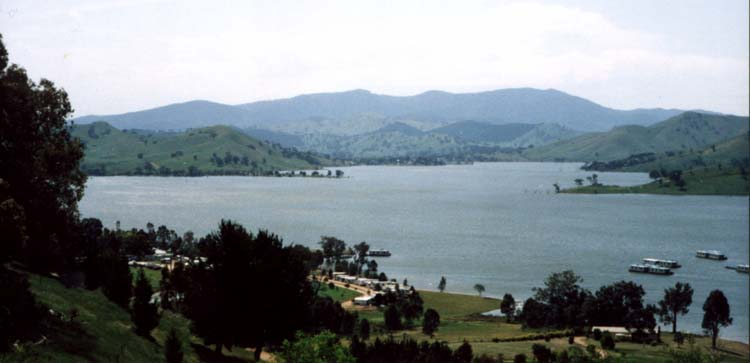
Peppin Point, 2010

== See also ==
- List of reservoirs and dams in Victoria
- List of power stations in Victoria
