= Lake Eildon National Park =

National park in Victoria, Australia

- IUCN category II (national park)
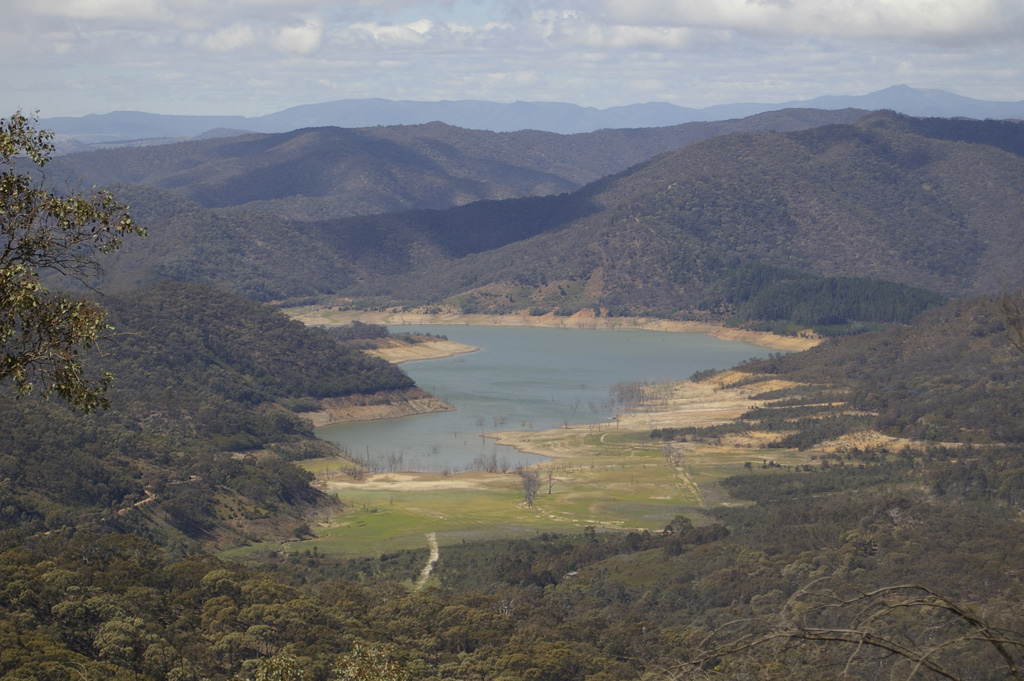
- Lake Eildon, the central feature of the national park

- Location within Victoria
- Location: Victoria
- Nearest city: Eildon
- Coordinates: 37°13′S 145°59′E
- Area: 277.5 km^{2} (107.1 sq mi)
- Established: 4 June 1997
- Governing body: Parks Victoria
- Website: Official website

The Lake Eildon National Park is a national park in the Central Highlands region of Victoria, Australia. The 27,750-hectare (68,600-acre) national park is set in the northern foothills of the Central Highlands, approximately 111 kilometres (69 mi) northeast of Melbourne and abuts the shores of Lake Eildon.

== History ==
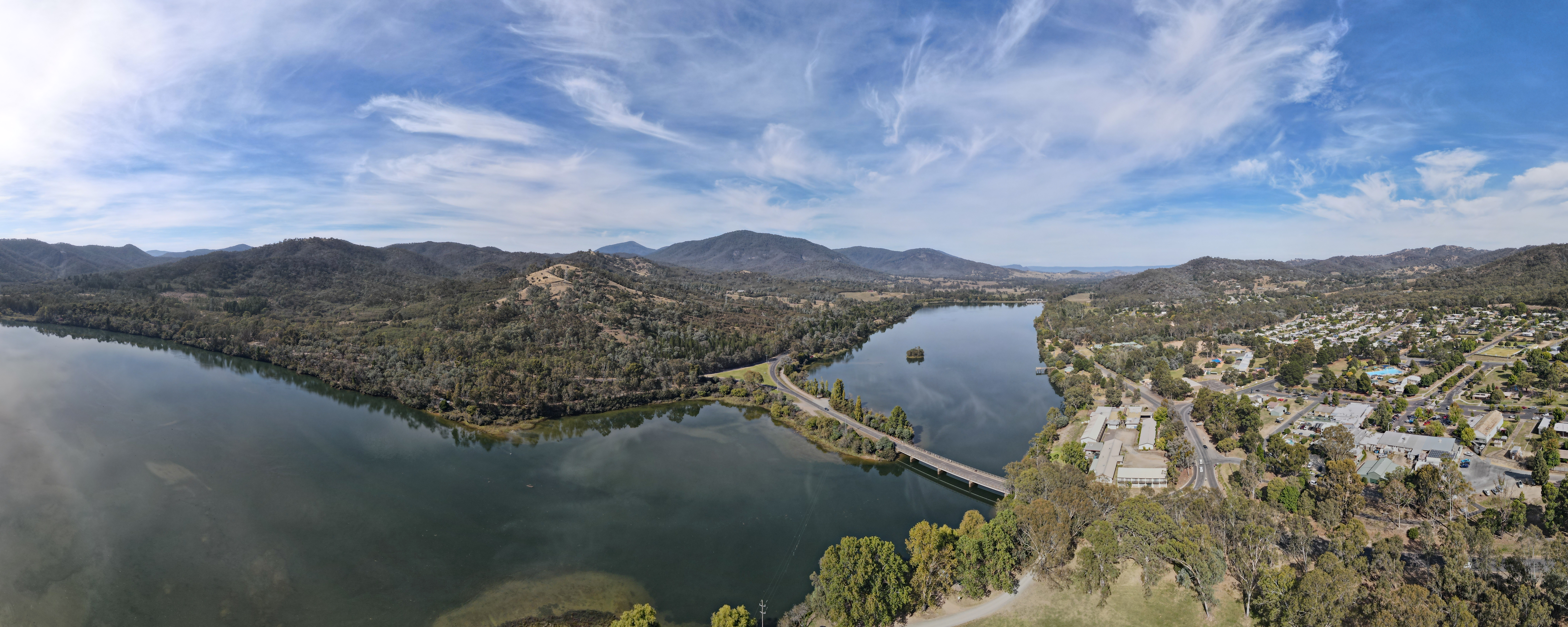
Lake Eildon National Park from above. March 2021.

The Goulburn River Valley supported a population of hundreds of members of the Aboriginal Australian group known as the Taungurung people. Cultural sites belonging to these people would have been flooded with the creation of Lake Eildon.

The park includes a number of mine shafts related to Victoria's gold rush of the 1860s. The park also contains relics from early pastoral use.

In the 1950s, the Victorian Government purchased farming properties along the Goulburn and Delatite rivers for the construction of Lake Eildon to provide irrigation water for the Goulburn Valley. An area of 2,670 hectares (6,600 acres) that wasn't flooded was declared Fraser National Park in 1957. An area of 24,000 hectares (59,000 acres) of state forest adjacent to the lake was reserved as Eildon State Park in 1980 to protect the catchment of Lake Eildon. In 1997, the two parks were combined to create Lake Eildon National Park.

== Geology ==
The park is mountainous, with peaks up to 900 metres (3,000 ft), and includes the edge of the Cerberean Caldera, a Supervolcano around 27 kilometres (17 mi) across which was active around 380 million years ago. The caldera is evident in a few places as granite outcrops. It is thought that the Cerberean Caldera underwent a super eruption 374 Mya, which in turn would have contributed to the Late Devonian extinction event.

== Gold Mining ==
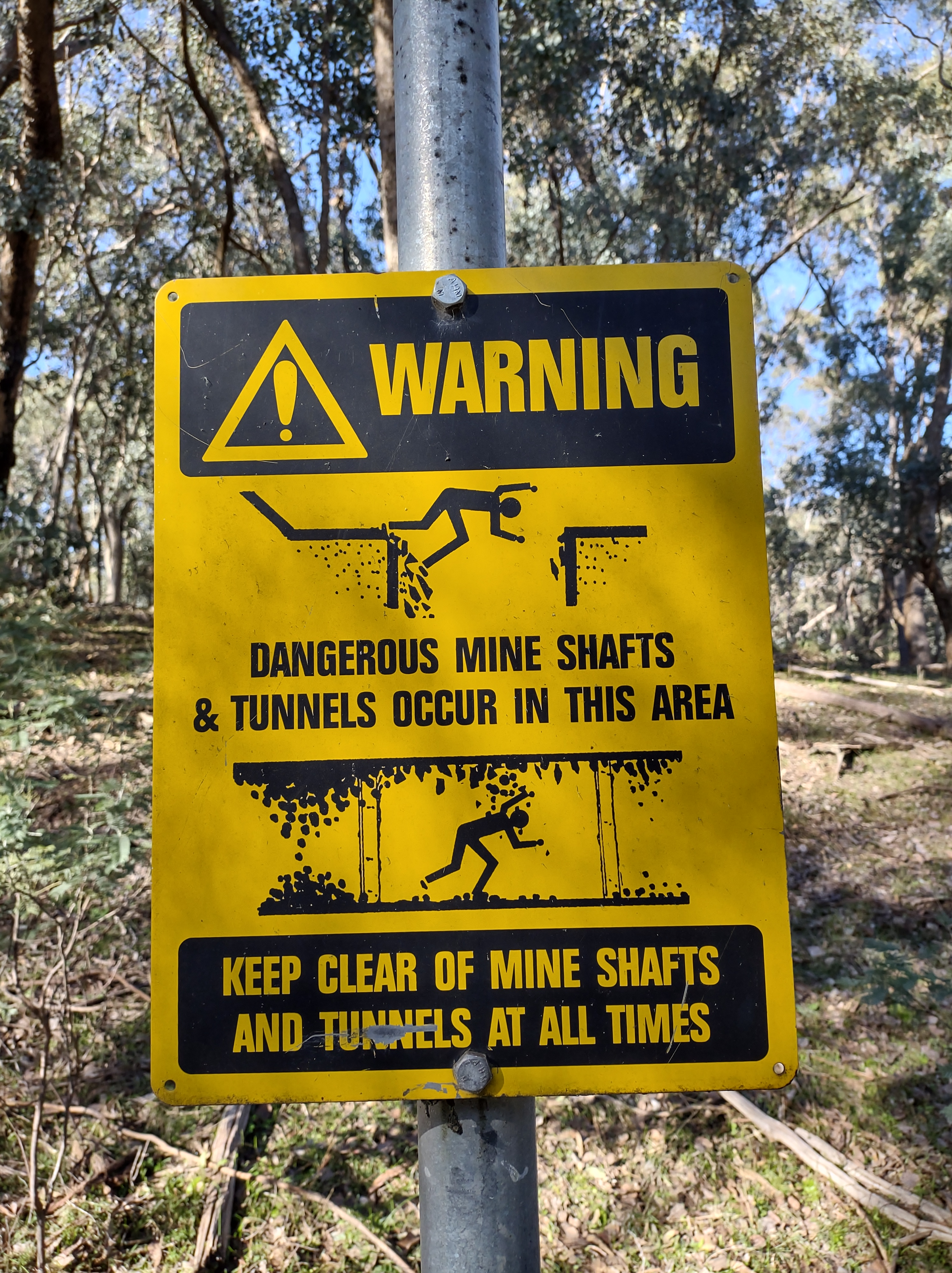
A sign warning of mine shafts and tunnels at Italian Gully

The national park contains evidence of gold mining including many shallow diggings, shafts and adits. The most notable sites in the Fraser block are:

- Italian Gully, originally worked in the 1870s and then again in the 1930s. This site consists of mine shafts, alluvial workings and the remains of a house and garden. 37.1415163°S 145.8252945°E
- Sunnyslopes Hut on Solferino (Sulphur) Reef, at the head of Italian and Mountaineer creeks. This site consists of multiple shafts, ruins of a hut, a partially collapsed flooded adit and large mullock heaps. 37.1461469°S 145.8096486°E

== Flora and Fauna ==
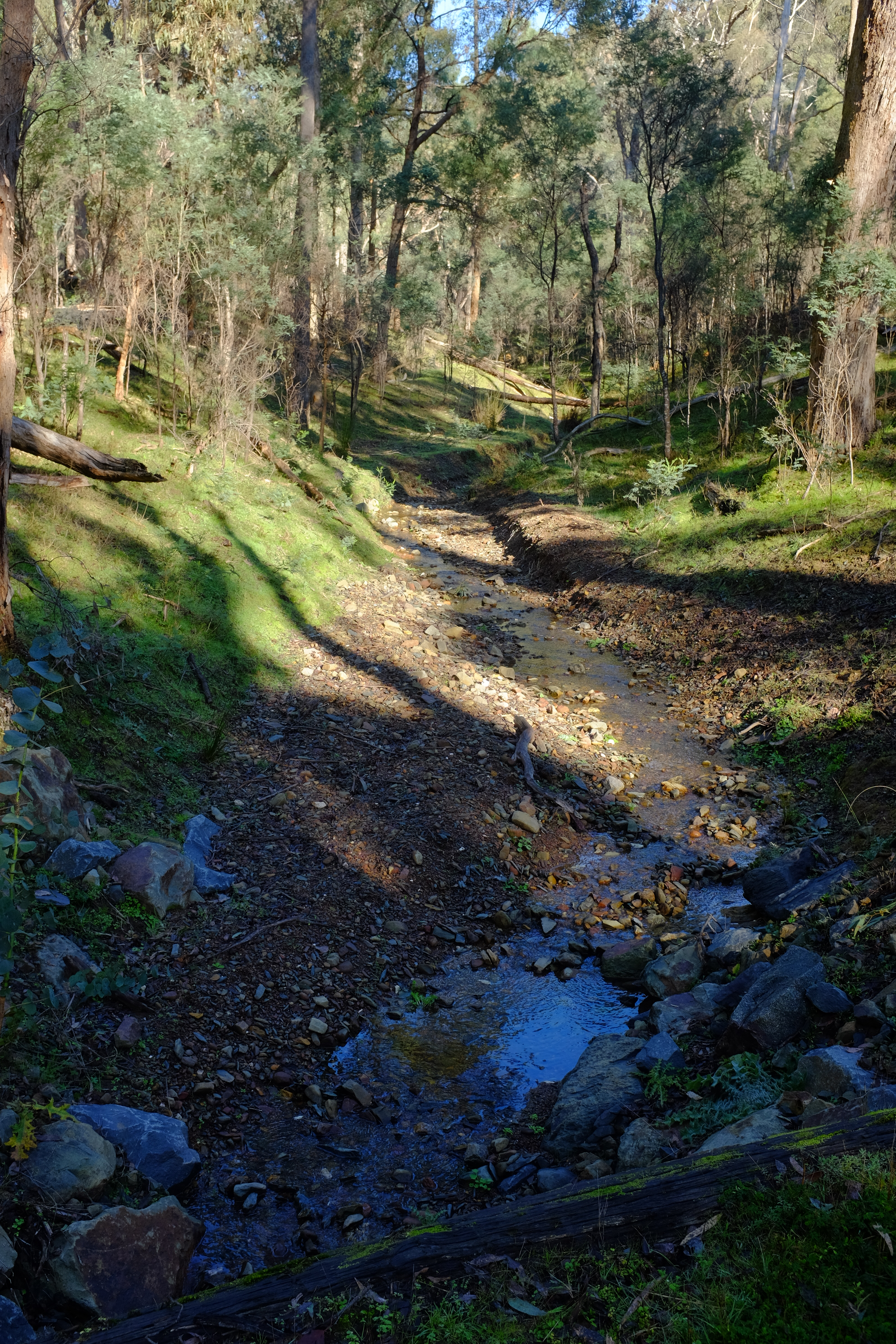
A small stream leading into Station Creek, typical of the environment in the Fraser Block.

The park's vegetation is generally dry, open eucalypt forest with areas of riparian forest and montane forest. Main eucalypt species are stringybarks, peppermints, Red Box and Candlebark with areas of Mountain Ash and Blue Gum.

The park's known native fauna includes 34 species of mammals, 89 birds, 17 reptiles, 10 amphibians, and three freshwater fish. Threatened fauna recorded in the park include the Brush-tailed Phascogale and Spotted Tree-Frog. Eastern Grey Kangaroos are very common in the park's camping places

After being hunted to extinction for their skins, in 1967 25 Koalas were reintroduced to the park from Phillip Island and released in the Devils Cove area.

Sambar Deer are also found throughout the park.

== Cultural Sites ==
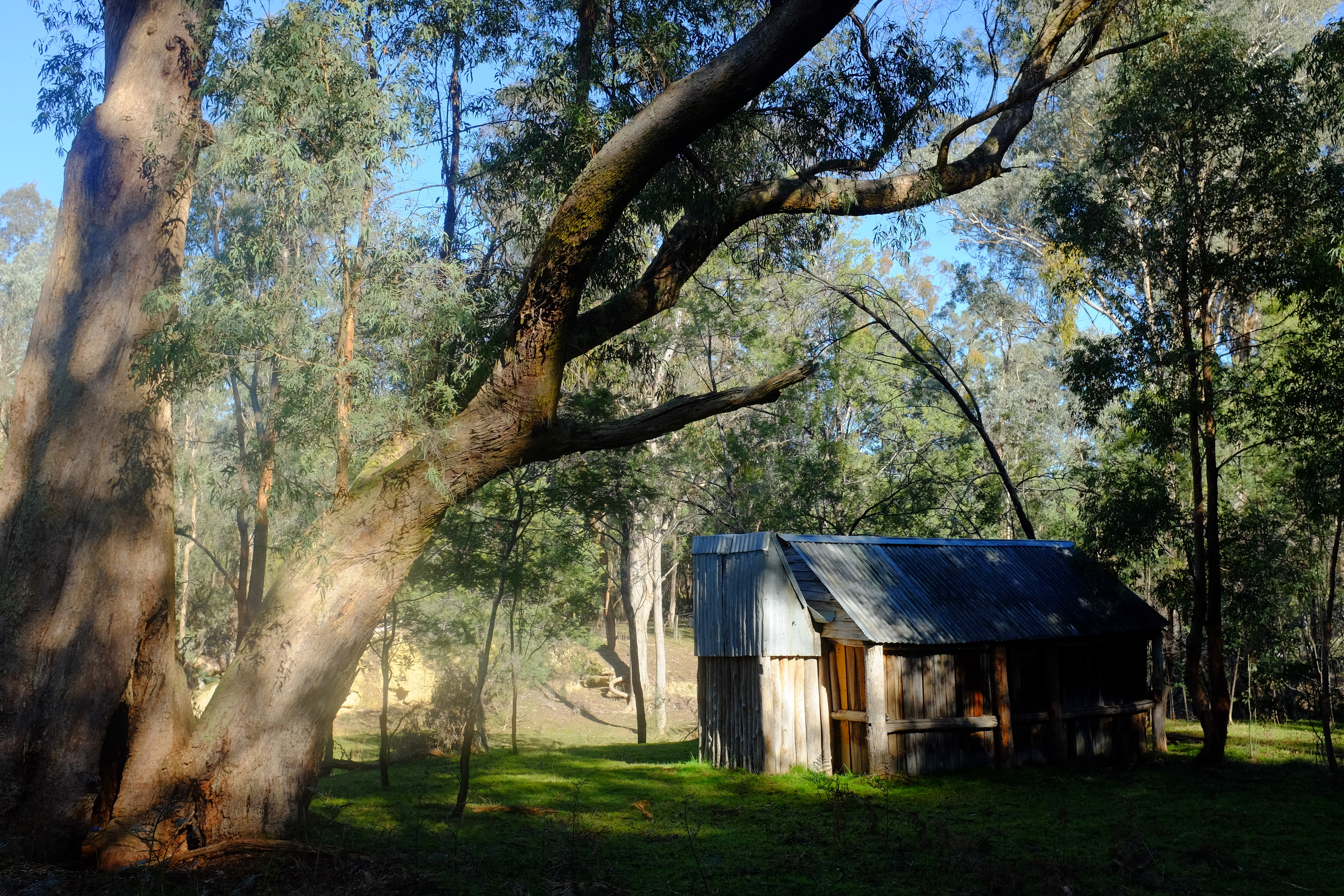
Stone's Outstation is one of the best preserved historical sites in the Fraser block.

There are numerous cultural sites in the National Park, demonstrating the areas past use for grazing and mining.

One of these is Stone's Outstation, located on Station Creek near Aird Inlet.

== Location ==
Lake Eildon National Park is non-contiguous and consists of five 'blocks' merged in June 1997 to create a single national park. They are:

From the former Eildon State Park:

- Enterprise - located in the centre of Lake Eildon itself.
- Jamieson - located on the eastern side of the national park adjacent to the township of Jamieson.
- Jerusalem - located on the southern of the national park, named for Jerusalem Creek. It contains Jerusalem Creek camping area with pit toilets as well as O’Toole Flat and Taylors Creek which are nominally designated for deer hunters.

From the former Fraser National Park:

- Fraser - located on the western side of the national park, named for the former park. It is the most developed and contains three camping areas; Lakeside, Candlebark and Devil Cove, all of which feature flushing toilets, hot showers, drinking water and gas BBQs.
- Wappan - located on the north west side. It is the least developed with no public vehicle access.

== Visitors ==
Most visitors use the park as a base for water-based activities on Lake Eildon, such as power boating and water ski-ing. Deer hunting is permitted in season in some sections of the park.

Mountaineer Inlet Boat Camp has no vehicle access and is for use for boaters and hikers only.

== See also ==
- Protected areas of Victoria
- List of national parks of Australia
