= Burnt Creek =

Stream in South Dakota, United States

Coordinates: 44°08′22″N 101°12′15″W

Burnt Creek is a stream in the U.S. state of South Dakota.

Burnt Creek once was the scene of a prairie fire, hence the name.

== See also ==
- List of rivers of South Dakota
- Schefferville, formerly known as—or technically a nearby original settlement was known as—Burnt Creek
