= Mount Buller (Victoria) =

Mountain in Victoria, Australia

- Warrinebut
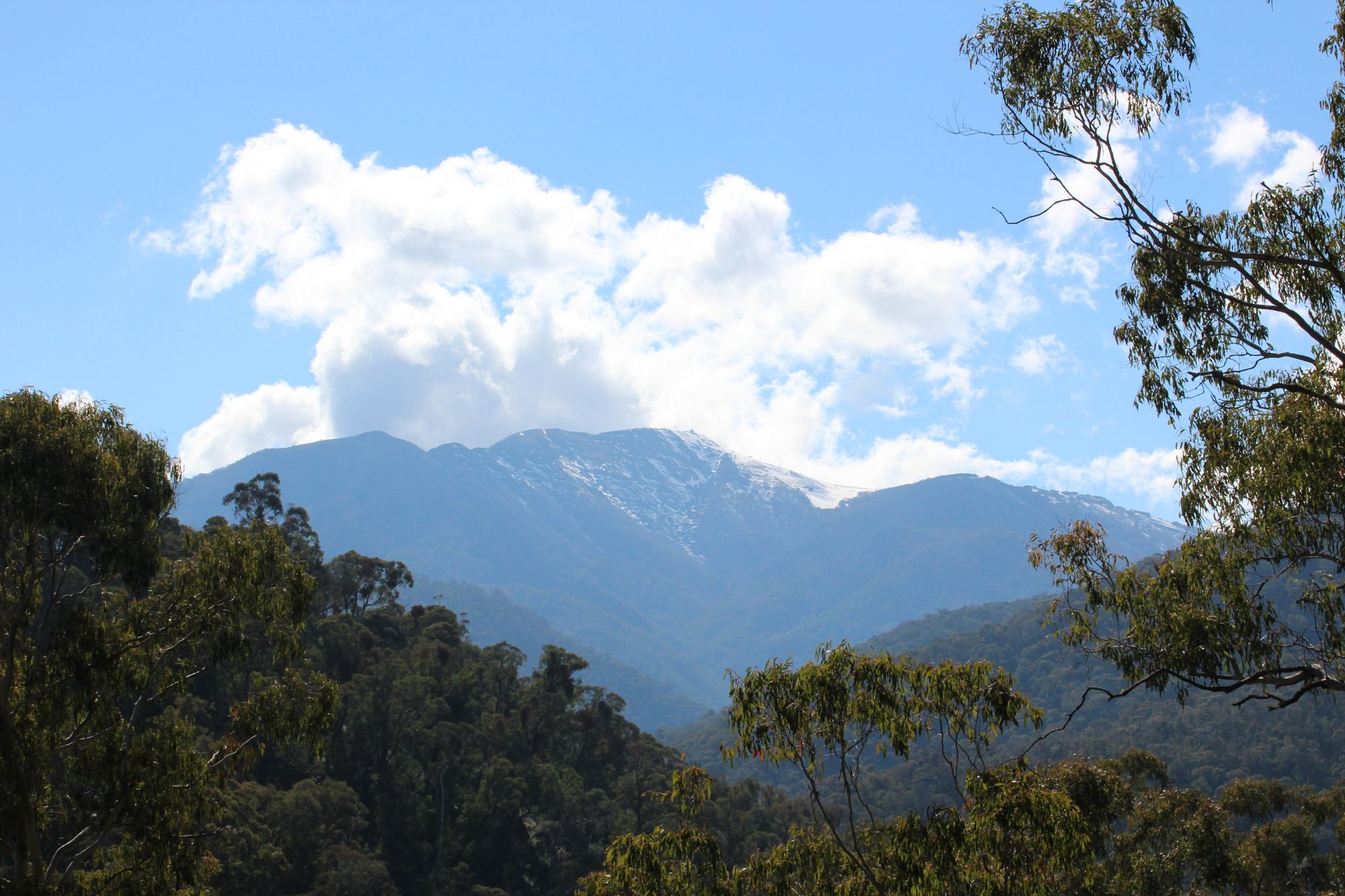
- Mount Buller from the Howqua Valley

Highest point
- Elevation: 1,805 metres (5,922 ft) AHD
- Prominence: 850 m (2,790 ft)
- Listing: Mountains of Victoria
- Coordinates: 37°8′43″S 146°25′34″E

Geography
- Location within Victoria
- Country: Australia
- State: Victoria
- Parent range: Victorian Alps, Great Dividing Range

Climbing
- Easiest route: Hike; ski

Mount Buller is a mountain in the Victorian Alps of the Great Dividing Range, located in the Australian state of Victoria. It has an elevation of 1,805 metres (5,922 ft) AHD.

== Toponym ==
The British explorer and surveyor Major Sir Thomas Livingstone Mitchell named the mountain after an acquaintance in the Colonial Office, Charles Buller. The local Indigenous Taungurong name for the mountain is Warrinebut.

== Geography ==
The summit of Buller can be approached by vehicle via the village coupled with a short 500 metres (1,600 ft) walk. It is also possible to climb the peak from Delatite River level along the Klingsporn walking track. The Klingsporn track was originally a bridle trail used by stockmen taking their cattle up to high ground during the summer months.

The walk begins at Merimbah and is a 8 kilometres (5.0 mi) walk on a well defined track. Mclaughlin Spur offers good views to the summit fire tower and the rocky outcrops that must be traversed. At the summit there is a stone distance dial and a fire tower that is staffed during the summer months.

== Climate ==
Under the Köppen climate classification scheme, Mount Buller has a very cold Oceanic / Subpolar oceanic climate (Cfb / Cfc) under the −3 °C (27 °F) isotherm, or a Humid continental / Subarctic climate (Dfb / Dfc) under the 0 °C (32 °F) isotherm, with cool summers and cold, very snowy winters. On average, Mount Buller receives 67.6 snowy days annually, the greatest figure for any mainland Australian site.

Due to its far south-western location in the alpine region, Mount Buller is more susceptible to cold airmasses which allow it to record some of the lowest maximum temperatures and daytime readings in the country, despite being considerably lower in elevation than other mountain sites to the north-east. On 5 September 1995, a maximum temperature of just −6.2 °C (20.8 °F) was registered at Mount Buller; the same day at Thredbo Top Station saw a maximum of −6.0 °C (21.2 °F), some 250 metres (820 ft) higher than Buller. On 3 February 2023, at the height of summer, Mount Buller reached a top of just 0.9 °C (33.6 °F).

Climate data for Mount Buller (1985–2022, rainfall to 1948); 1,707 m AMSL; 37.15° S, 146.44° E
Month	Jan	Feb	Mar	Apr	May	Jun	Jul	Aug	Sep	Oct	Nov	Dec	Year
Record high °C (°F)	30.3 (86.5)	30.7 (87.3)	26.0 (78.8)	21.6 (70.9)	16.5 (61.7)	12.7 (54.9)	10.1 (50.2)	10.8 (51.4)	16.7 (62.1)	21.6 (70.9)	26.1 (79.0)	27.7 (81.9)	30.7 (87.3)
Mean daily maximum °C (°F)	17.6 (63.7)	17.1 (62.8)	14.2 (57.6)	9.9 (49.8)	6.1 (43.0)	3.2 (37.8)	1.4 (34.5)	2.0 (35.6)	4.9 (40.8)	8.7 (47.7)	12.3 (54.1)	14.7 (58.5)	9.3 (48.8)
Daily mean °C (°F)	13.4 (56.1)	13.0 (55.4)	10.5 (50.9)	6.8 (44.2)	3.6 (38.5)	1.0 (33.8)	−0.6 (30.9)	−0.3 (31.5)	2.1 (35.8)	5.1 (41.2)	8.5 (47.3)	10.6 (51.1)	6.1 (43.1)
Mean daily minimum °C (°F)	9.1 (48.4)	8.8 (47.8)	6.7 (44.1)	3.7 (38.7)	1.0 (33.8)	−1.3 (29.7)	−2.6 (27.3)	−2.5 (27.5)	−0.7 (30.7)	1.5 (34.7)	4.6 (40.3)	6.4 (43.5)	2.9 (37.2)
Record low °C (°F)	−3.5 (25.7)	−2.6 (27.3)	−4.5 (23.9)	−6.9 (19.6)	−6.9 (19.6)	−9.1 (15.6)	−10.2 (13.6)	−8.7 (16.3)	−8.4 (16.9)	−7.6 (18.3)	−5.8 (21.6)	−5.1 (22.8)	−10.2 (13.6)
Average precipitation mm (inches)	79.7 (3.14)	73.2 (2.88)	81.6 (3.21)	111.2 (4.38)	141.4 (5.57)	155.6 (6.13)	165.8 (6.53)	161.7 (6.37)	144.0 (5.67)	145.0 (5.71)	126.8 (4.99)	100.1 (3.94)	1,486.1 (58.52)
Average precipitation days (≥ 0.2 mm)	7.7	6.9	8.4	10.5	13.7	14.9	17.0	17.2	14.4	14.2	11.5	9.4	145.8
Average afternoon relative humidity (%)	66	66	69	79	85	89	90	91	87	78	71	68	78
Average dew point °C (°F)	8.1 (46.6)	8.0 (46.4)	6.4 (43.5)	4.3 (39.7)	1.8 (35.2)	−0.2 (31.6)	−1.3 (29.7)	−0.4 (31.3)	1.3 (34.3)	2.6 (36.7)	4.6 (40.3)	6.2 (43.2)	3.5 (38.2)

== Resort ==
The Mount Buller Alpine Resort is a popular destination in winter for skiers and snowboarders of all abilities who wish to attend for the day. With it only being a 3 hour drive, it is the nearest major downhill ski resort to Melbourne. In the warmer months, it provides a base for day visitors and hikers in the Victorian Alps.

== Gallery ==
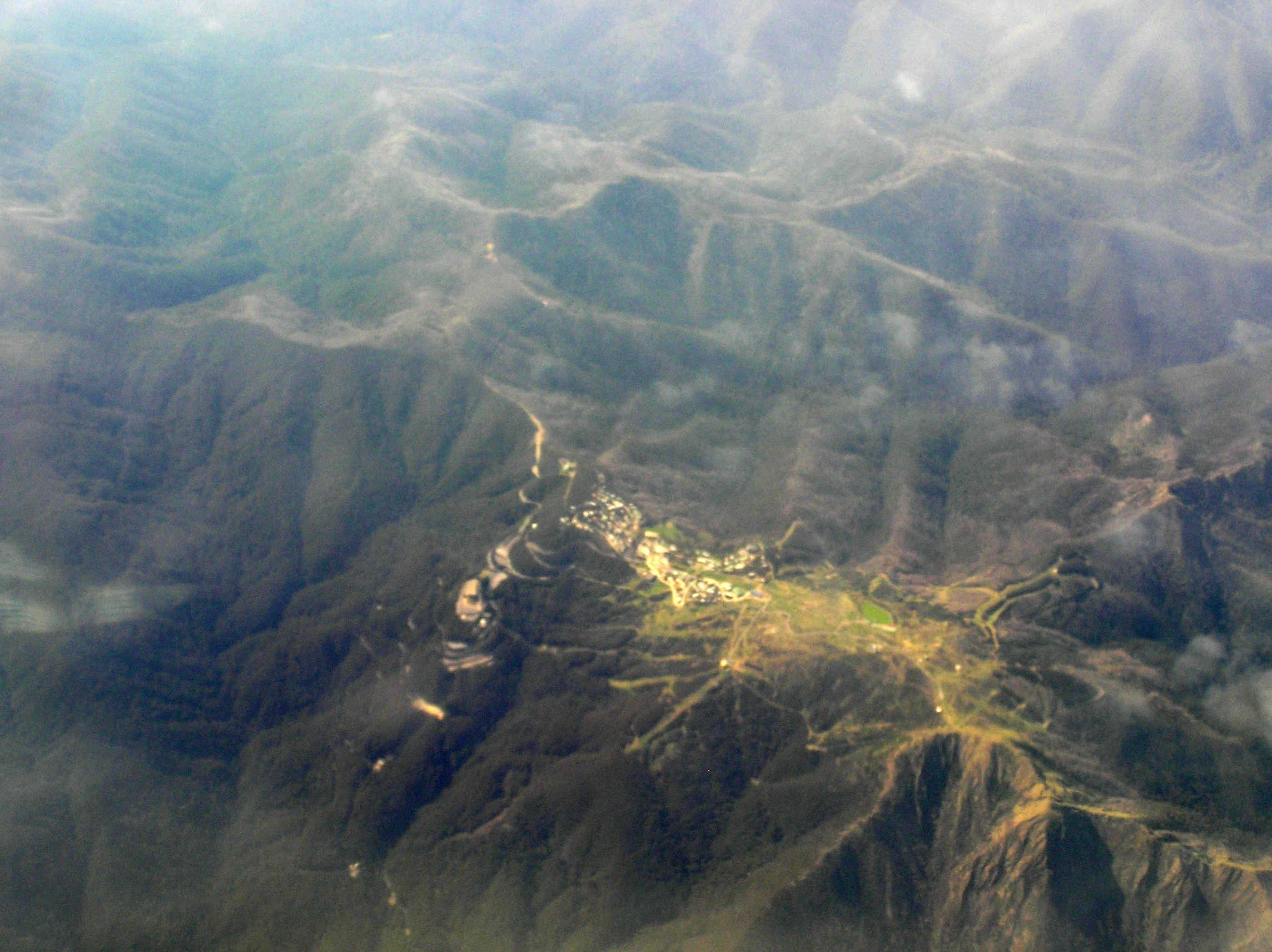
Aerial photo of Mount Buller.

== See also ==
- Alpine National Park
- Mount Timbertop
