= Merrijig =

- Town
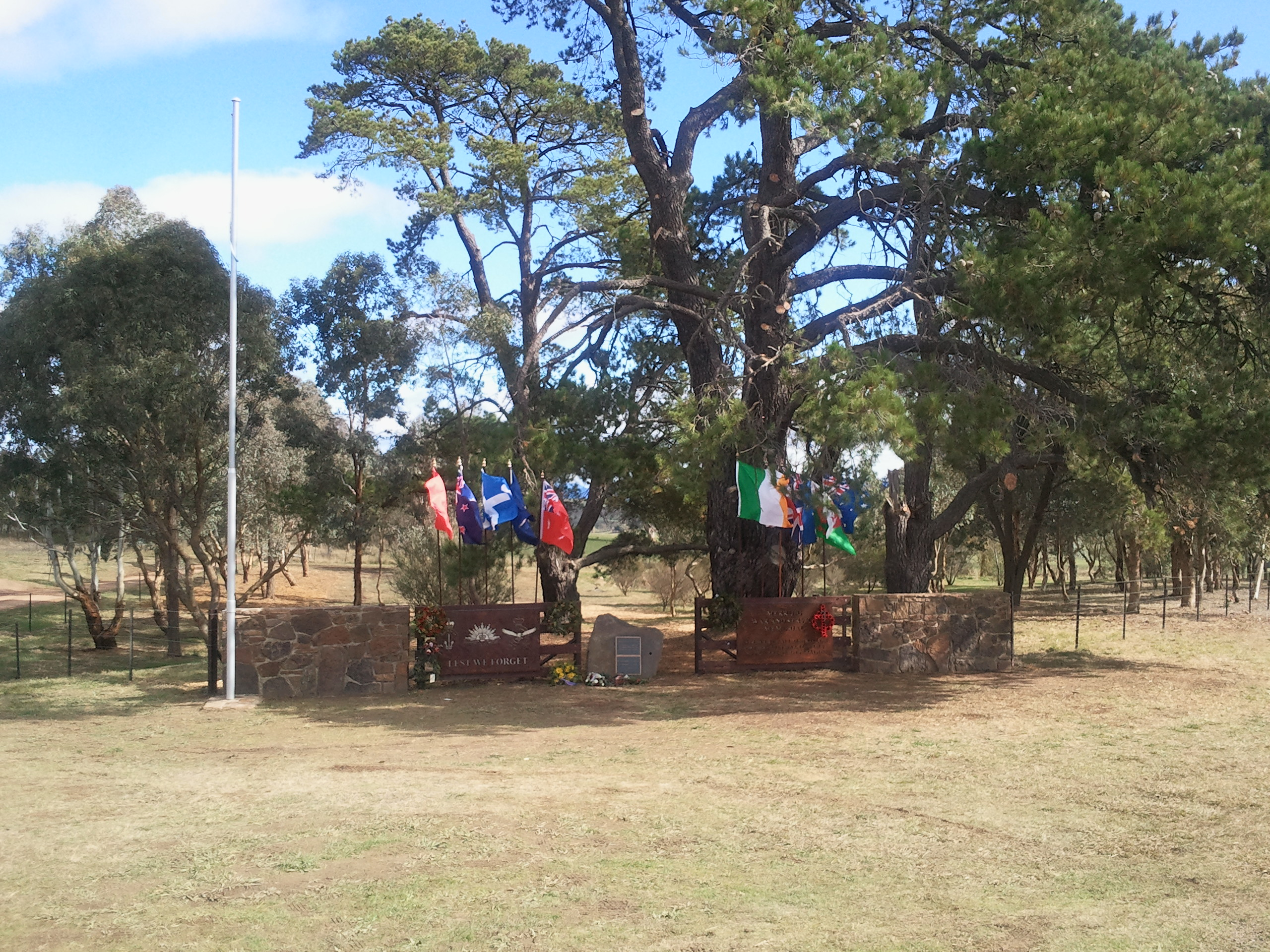
- War memorial at Merrijig

- Interactive map of Merrijig
- Coordinates: 37°06′S 146°15′E
- Country: Australia
- State: Victoria
- Region: Hume
- LGA: Shire of Mansfield
- Location: 201 km (125 mi) NE of Melbourne; 19 km (12 mi) E of Mansfield; 71 km (44 mi) NW of Mount Buller

Government
  - State electorate: Eildon
  - Federal division: Indi

Population
  - Total: 721 (2021 census)
- Postcode: 3723
- Annual rainfall: 815.7 mm (32.11 in)

Merrijig is a town in North-East Victoria, Australia, located between Mount Buller and Mansfield. At the 2021 census, Merrijig and the surrounding area had a population of 721.

The first Merrijig Post Office opened on 4 October 1866 and was replaced by Boggy Creek in 1867. Another Merrijig Post Office opened on 1 April 1866 (known as Delatite from 1872 until 1924) and closed in 1970.

A second placename in Victoria named "Merrijig" exists in East Gippsland, about 10 kilometres north of Lindenow.

Merrijig is an Aboriginal word that may mean "good, well done". The word 'merri' appears in numerous other Victorian Aboriginal place names. Most other nearby area names derived from Indigenous Elders (& relatives) names, and end in the suffix “ite”; for example, Delatite, Booralite & Beolite.

The feature film The Man from Snowy River was shot in Merrijig. It is also the location of Nevil Shute's novel The Far Country.

Merrijig is also home to Timbertop, a campus of Geelong Grammar School at the foot of Mount Timbertop.
