= Eildon, Victoria =

Eildon
- Town
- Coordinates: 37°14′0″S 145°55′0″E
- Country: Australia
- State: Victoria
- Region: Hume
- LGA: Shire of Murrindindi
- Location: 141 km (88 mi) NE of Melbourne; 57 km (35 mi) SW of Mansfield; 26 km (16 mi) E of Alexandra

Government
  - State electorate: Eildon
  - Federal division: Indi
- Elevation: 232 m (761 ft)

Population
  - Total: 944 (2021 census)
- Postcode: 3713
- Mean max temp: 20.5 °C (68.9 °F)
- Mean min temp: 8.0 °C (46.4 °F)
- Annual rainfall: 850.4 mm (33.48 in)

Eildon is a town in central Victoria, Australia. It is located near Lake Eildon, on the Goulburn Valley Highway, in the Shire of Murrindindi local government area. At the 2021 census, Eildon had a population of 944.

Taungurung people are the traditional owners of the land around Eildon (which stretches north-east beyond Mansfield, Victoria and to the west nearly to Bendigo). Taungurung country is part of the Kulin nation.

The name Eildon was given to the township by some of the first white settlers in the area, Mr and Mrs Archibald Thom in 1846, and was so named for its similarities to Mrs Thom's birthplace in the Eildon Hills near Abottsford in Scotland.

== History ==
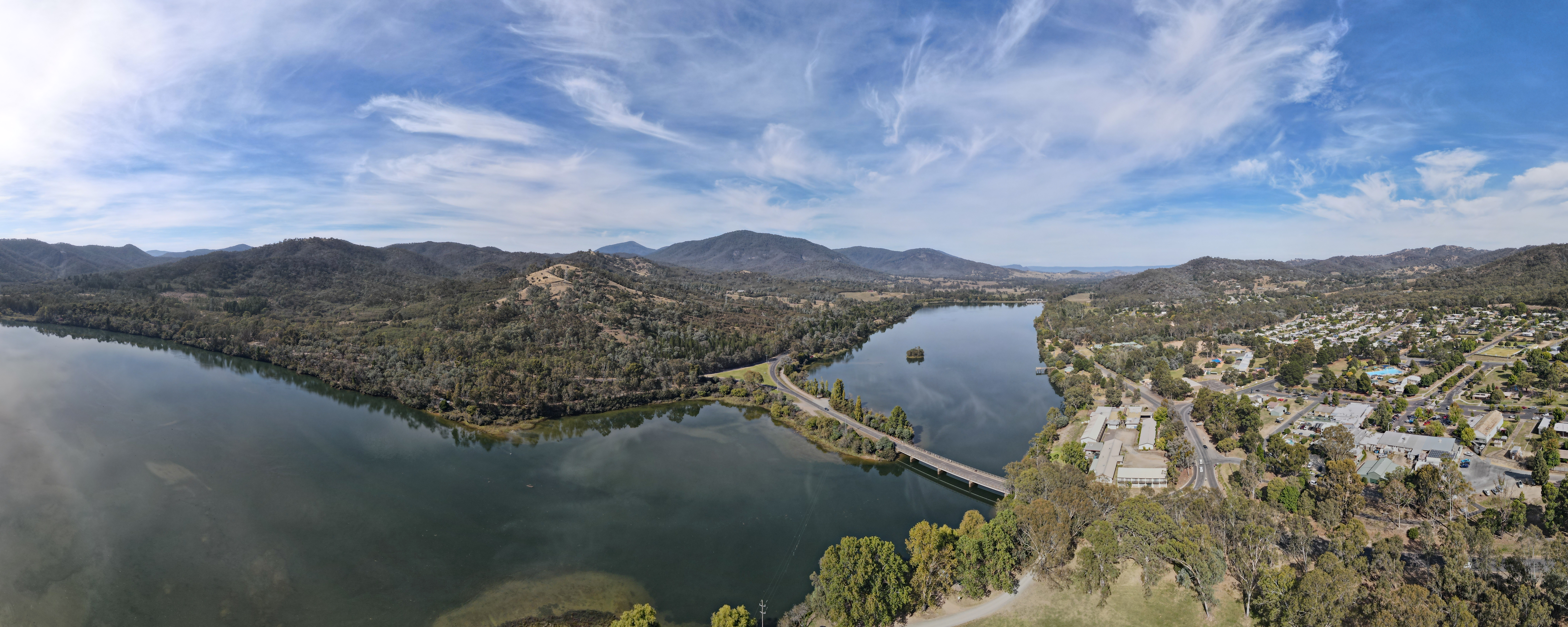
Lake Eildon National Park from above. March 2021.

Eildon as a township came about due to the construction of the Sugarloaf Reservoir. The township of Darlingford (which was located near the junction of Big River and the Goulburn River) was established in the 1860s, when gold was discovered nearby, however when the construction of the reservoir commenced in 1915, which would ultimately flood the land behind the dam wall, including the township of Darlingford and Eildon Station (a run of 25,000 hectares owned by the Thoms). The town of Darlingford was moved closer to where the current township is now located. The Sugarloaf Dam was completed in 1929, and the original town of Darlingford is now completely underwater.

Workers were brought into the town by the State Rivers and Water Supply Commission to work on the building of the reservoir, and the shanty town called Eildon began to develop. Many lived in tents.

The original Sugarloaf Dam could only hold around 10% of the capacity of the current dam, and so construction of the Eildon Dam commenced in 1951 and was completed by 1956 to increase the size and capacity of the lake. The Sugarloaf Reservoir Dam Wall sits about 100 metres behind the current dam wall, and is visible when the water level drops very low.

Around 4,000 workers were required to complete the 1950s construction, and these workers were brought in, but required housing. The new township of Eildon relocated to the present position, and comprises a series of 300 semi-permanent houses in 14 different styles. Materials for the houses were pre-cut and fabricated in England and assembled onsite. Temporary houses and hostels were built to accommodate more workers. If you drive around Eildon today, you will see many houses are still the original pre-fabricated houses erected for workers in the 1950s.

The original Eildon post office opened on 14 November 1890 and closed in 1893. It was reopened on 23 August 1915 as Eildon Weir, with the word "Weir" being removed from the name in about 1950.

== Climate ==
Lake Eildon is most notable for its extraordinary cloud cover in winter, measuring only 69 sun hours in June; this is especially cloudy for a location at only 37 degrees of latitude. Summers are generally warm and sunny, though with the passage of cold fronts are normally interspersed with much cooler days and nights.

Climate data for Lake Eildon (1970–2025, rainfall to 1887); 230 m AMSL; 37.23° S, 145.91° E
Month	Jan	Feb	Mar	Apr	May	Jun	Jul	Aug	Sep	Oct	Nov	Dec	Year
Record high °C (°F)	43.3 (109.9)	45.4 (113.7)	39.1 (102.4)	34.1 (93.4)	26.9 (80.4)	20.5 (68.9)	21.0 (69.8)	24.5 (76.1)	28.5 (83.3)	34.2 (93.6)	38.9 (102.0)	40.4 (104.7)	45.4 (113.7)
Mean daily maximum °C (°F)	29.2 (84.6)	29.1 (84.4)	25.8 (78.4)	20.9 (69.6)	16.1 (61.0)	12.6 (54.7)	12.1 (53.8)	13.7 (56.7)	16.7 (62.1)	20.1 (68.2)	23.7 (74.7)	26.6 (79.9)	20.5 (69.0)
Mean daily minimum °C (°F)	12.9 (55.2)	12.8 (55.0)	10.7 (51.3)	7.9 (46.2)	5.9 (42.6)	4.1 (39.4)	3.7 (38.7)	4.3 (39.7)	5.7 (42.3)	7.3 (45.1)	9.5 (49.1)	11.2 (52.2)	8.0 (46.4)
Record low °C (°F)	2.8 (37.0)	3.2 (37.8)	2.1 (35.8)	0.0 (32.0)	−1.8 (28.8)	−3.6 (25.5)	−4.3 (24.3)	−4.1 (24.6)	−1.8 (28.8)	−1.1 (30.0)	0.7 (33.3)	2.1 (35.8)	−4.3 (24.3)
Average precipitation mm (inches)	48.8 (1.92)	42.0 (1.65)	51.9 (2.04)	60.3 (2.37)	78.1 (3.07)	92.3 (3.63)	92.7 (3.65)	98.5 (3.88)	81.1 (3.19)	79.2 (3.12)	67.3 (2.65)	57.9 (2.28)	850.4 (33.48)
Average precipitation days (≥ 0.2mm)	5.8	5.1	6.5	8.4	12.1	14.3	16.0	16.1	13.3	11.7	9.2	7.6	126.1
Average afternoon relative humidity (%)	41	40	45	53	66	75	73	65	59	53	48	43	55
Mean monthly sunshine hours	269.7	245.8	226.3	177.0	108.5	69.0	77.5	114.7	156.0	220.1	234.0	244.9	2,143.5

Eildon Fire Tower to the west-northwest is 407 metres (1,335 ft) higher in altitude and located on an exposed hilltop. Snowfalls are common here and cloud cover is extremely heavy in the winter months, as evident from the mean afternoon humidity readings in June and July. Cold weather can be present at any time of the year; with a daily maximum of 8.9 °C (48.0 °F) having occurred on 1 December 2019, and on 3 February 2005 the maximum did not exceed 9.2 °C (48.6 °F).

Climate data for Eildon Fire Tower (1996–2025); 637 m AMSL; 37.21° S, 145.84° E
Month	Jan	Feb	Mar	Apr	May	Jun	Jul	Aug	Sep	Oct	Nov	Dec	Year
Record high °C (°F)	41.0 (105.8)	41.7 (107.1)	36.1 (97.0)	29.4 (84.9)	22.5 (72.5)	17.5 (63.5)	17.2 (63.0)	19.3 (66.7)	26.1 (79.0)	30.6 (87.1)	36.2 (97.2)	38.5 (101.3)	41.7 (107.1)
Mean daily maximum °C (°F)	27.4 (81.3)	26.6 (79.9)	23.3 (73.9)	18.3 (64.9)	13.3 (55.9)	10.2 (50.4)	9.3 (48.7)	10.7 (51.3)	13.7 (56.7)	17.0 (62.6)	21.0 (69.8)	24.1 (75.4)	17.9 (64.2)
Mean daily minimum °C (°F)	13.7 (56.7)	13.6 (56.5)	11.8 (53.2)	9.2 (48.6)	6.6 (43.9)	4.7 (40.5)	3.9 (39.0)	4.3 (39.7)	5.8 (42.4)	7.5 (45.5)	9.8 (49.6)	11.4 (52.5)	8.5 (47.3)
Record low °C (°F)	4.0 (39.2)	4.2 (39.6)	4.0 (39.2)	1.4 (34.5)	−0.4 (31.3)	−0.5 (31.1)	−1.3 (29.7)	−1.4 (29.5)	−0.6 (30.9)	−0.9 (30.4)	1.3 (34.3)	2.4 (36.3)	−1.4 (29.5)
Average precipitation mm (inches)	46.2 (1.82)	37.2 (1.46)	40.4 (1.59)	51.4 (2.02)	54.9 (2.16)	67.6 (2.66)	66.1 (2.60)	73.7 (2.90)	62.3 (2.45)	57.6 (2.27)	59.4 (2.34)	53.1 (2.09)	671.3 (26.43)
Average precipitation days (≥ 0.2mm)	7.2	6.2	7.9	9.3	15.4	18.2	20.3	19.1	15.8	13.0	10.7	8.6	151.7
Average afternoon relative humidity (%)	38	40	44	54	70	79	80	75	69	60	52	43	59

== Recreation ==
Together with its neighbouring township Thornton, Eildon has an Australian Rules football team (Thornton-Eildon) competing in the Outer East Football Netball League. Thornton-Eildon currently only field a women's side, with the men's teams entering recess in 2020.

Golfers play at the course of the Eildon Golf Club on Jamieson Road.

There are hiking and mountain bike trails.

== Fishing ==
Lake Eildon is a scenic destination for avid fisherpeople, and some of the more common species of fish found in the lake include Redfin, Murray Cod, Carp and Golden Perch. The lake benefits from the Snobs Creek Fish Hatchery Native Fish Stocking program, which in 2020 restocked the lake with more than 500,000 Murray Cod and more than 200,000 Golden Perch.

== See also ==
- Lake Eildon National Park
