= Mount Buller Alpine Resort =

Ski resort in Victoria, Australia

Mount Buller Ski Area
- Interactive map of Mount Buller Ski Area
- Location: Mount Buller
- Nearest city: Benalla
- Coordinates: 37.14620°S 146.44982°E
- Vertical: 405 metres (1,329 ft)
- Top elevation: 1,780 metres (5,840 ft)
- Base elevation: 1,375 metres (4,511 ft)
- Skiable area: 300 hectares (740 acres)
- Trails: 85
- Longest run: 2.5 kilometres (1.6 mi)
- Lift system: Detachable Chair x3, Fixed-Grip Chair x10, T-Bar x5, Rope Tow x2, Magic Carpet x2
- Lift capacity: 40,000 skiers/hr
- Terrain parks: 4
- Snowfall: Yes
- Snowmaking: Yes
- Night skiing: Saturday and Sunday (July and August)
- Website: www.mtbuller.com.au

The Mount Buller Alpine Resort is a ski resort located on Mount Buller in Victoria, Australia.

The Mount Buller Alpine Resort is an unincorporated area under the direct administration of the government of Victoria, and is surrounded by the Shire of Mansfield.

== Mount Buller Ski Resort ==
The ski area around the town has a network of 22 lifts, capable of moving more than 40,000 people per hour - the highest capacity in Victoria. The highest lifted point is 1780 m at Grimus Chairlift and the base altitude is 1375 m at the Chalet Creek loading station on the Northside Express (formerly Horse Hill) chairlift. The lifts are owned by Buller Ski Lifts, a subsidiary of Grollo.

=== History ===
A Mount Buller Post Office opened on 17 February 1958.

Before 1984 Mount Buller was serviced by two lift companies that involved the skier needing to purchase two lift tickets to ski the whole mountain. In 1985, the two lift companies merged, allowing skiers to ski the whole mountain with one ticket. Today, Mount Buller is serviced by 22 lifts covering a wide range of terrain. In 1993, with an increasing number of visitors, the ski resort built a new quad chairlift called Wombat Lift on the skiers right of Little Buller spur to relieve the traffic on Federation triple chairlift. 2005 saw the addition of the Emirates quad chairlift to the lift network. A new six-seater chairlift was installed over the 2007/08 summer and is operational for 2008. This addition saw the decommissioning of one of the oldest chairs of the mountain — the Abom (previously known as Helicopter), along with Blue Bullet 2. In 2012 a new quad chairlift (Bonza) was built in the area of the old Burnt Hut T-Bar. A new carpet was also built. In December 2018 the construction of a new 6 seat chairlift commenced to replace the ageing Blue Bullet Quad, now called Bourke Street Express. A new Plata lift to replace the upper rope tow on Chamois was installed for the 2019 season.

In 2020, the construction of a new 100ML dam was completed, increasing snowmaking capacity across the mountain.

A list of all lifts that have operated at Mount Buller is at the Australian ski lift directory.

=== Facilities ===
There are around 80 kilometres (50 mi) of groomed trails spread over more than 300 hectares of terrain. 25% is beginner terrain, 45% intermediate and 30% advanced. There are also 9 kilometres (5.6 mi) of cross-country trails accessible from the village. These trails also connect Mount Buller with Mount Stirling. Australia's first resort-wide wireless internet service was deployed in 2006 in the village, operated by Whispar. The project was abandoned shortly after.

21 Lifts at Mount Buller include 3 detachable grip chairs (Bourke Street Express, Northside Express, and ABOM Express), 10 fixed grip chairs (Bonza, Bull Run, Federation, Grimus, Howqua, Lydia Lassila, The Fox, South Side, Summit, and Wombat) and 8 surface lifts (Bourke Street Carpet, Canyon Tows, Cattleman's Carpets, Gliders Carpet, Happy Feet Carpet, Koflers T-Bar, Skyline T-Bar, and Tirol T-Bar).

=== Events ===
Mount Buller usually hosts two International Ski Federation Aerial Skiing World Cup events every year in September. However, these events were cancelled in 2007 due to lack of sponsorship. Every year Mount Buller also hosts the Victorian Snowsports Championships, which has with over 3000 competitors.

The Mount Buller summit and faces are also popular with ice climbers especially in winter.

Transportation on the Mount Buller mountain village has previously been provided by Mansfield Mount Buller Bus Lines. However, a change in supplier from the 2019 snow season occurred with TravelSafe Bus Hire appointed as the official transit provider for Mount Buller with Bendigo Coachlines the primary operator. However, TravelSafe's performance was poor, plagued by technical difficulties and was unable to keep up with the service load. Now TravelSafe and Mansfield Mount Buller Bus Lines co-exist on the mountain with both handling transportation.

== Snowmaking ==
Snowmaking began on Mount Buller in the 1970s with a pilot system on Enzian Ski Run, which was later moved to Bourke Street. The main snowmaking infrastructure was installed in 1994 at the Snowflake Factory on the top of Baldy. This included the water storage reservoir, air compressors, pump station and distribution pipelines for water and compressed air. The snowmaking system infrastructure and distribution pipelines were designed and built to accommodate future increases in capacity as coverage areas are increased. The decreasing dependability of snowfalls due to climate change has made the investment in snowmaking a priority.

The Mount Buller snowmaking systems use a combination system of fan and air/water guns. The system is based around a central high level water storage reservoir, pump station and central air compressor station. Large distribution pipelines deliver the water and compressed air to the various ski runs. Water and compressed air delivery hydrants are located down the edge of the runs where the snow guns are coupled using flexible snowmaking hoses. The system currently has 223 snow gun connection hydrants around the mountain, of these, 81 are connected to snowmaking guns - 57 fan guns and 58 air/water guns.

2017 saw the addition of a Techno Alpin SF 220 Snow factory capable of producing 220 cubic metres of snow daily at 15 degrees Celsius.

A new Techo Alpin SF 100 will be installed prior to the 2019 season which is a smaller, but mobile version of the SF 220.

The total area of snowmaking for skiing is in excess of 74 hectares (180 acres). The coverage of snowmaking at Mount Buller includes:

- Access trails
- Baldy
- Bonza Country
- Bourke Street
- Chamois
- D. Campbell Creek Area
- Family Run
- Howqua
- Howqua Extension
- Little Buller Spur
- Koflers
- Magic Forest
- Scott Talbut Downhill
- Shakey Knees
- Skyline
- Snowtubing Park
- Spurs Beginner Area
- Summit
- The Hard Shafts Bowl
- Whiskey Creek Trail
- Wombat

== Ownership and operation ==
A single board administers both the Mount Buller and Mount Stirling Alpine Resorts and fulfils the functions of a council in Victoria. The Mount Stirling Alpine Resort is surrounded by, but not a part of, the Shire of Mansfield for the management of the alpine resort. Separate management for alpine resorts in Victoria has been provided for since the Forests Act 1958, and regulations for the administration of Mount Buller were first made in 1960. Since 1997 alpine resorts declared under the Alpine Resort Act 1983 have been excised from the surrounding municipal district. In October 2022 Alpine Resorts Victoria was established to manage the six alpine resorts of Victoria including Mt Buller.

== See also ==
- Skiing in Australia
