= Jamieson, Victoria =

Jamieson
- Town
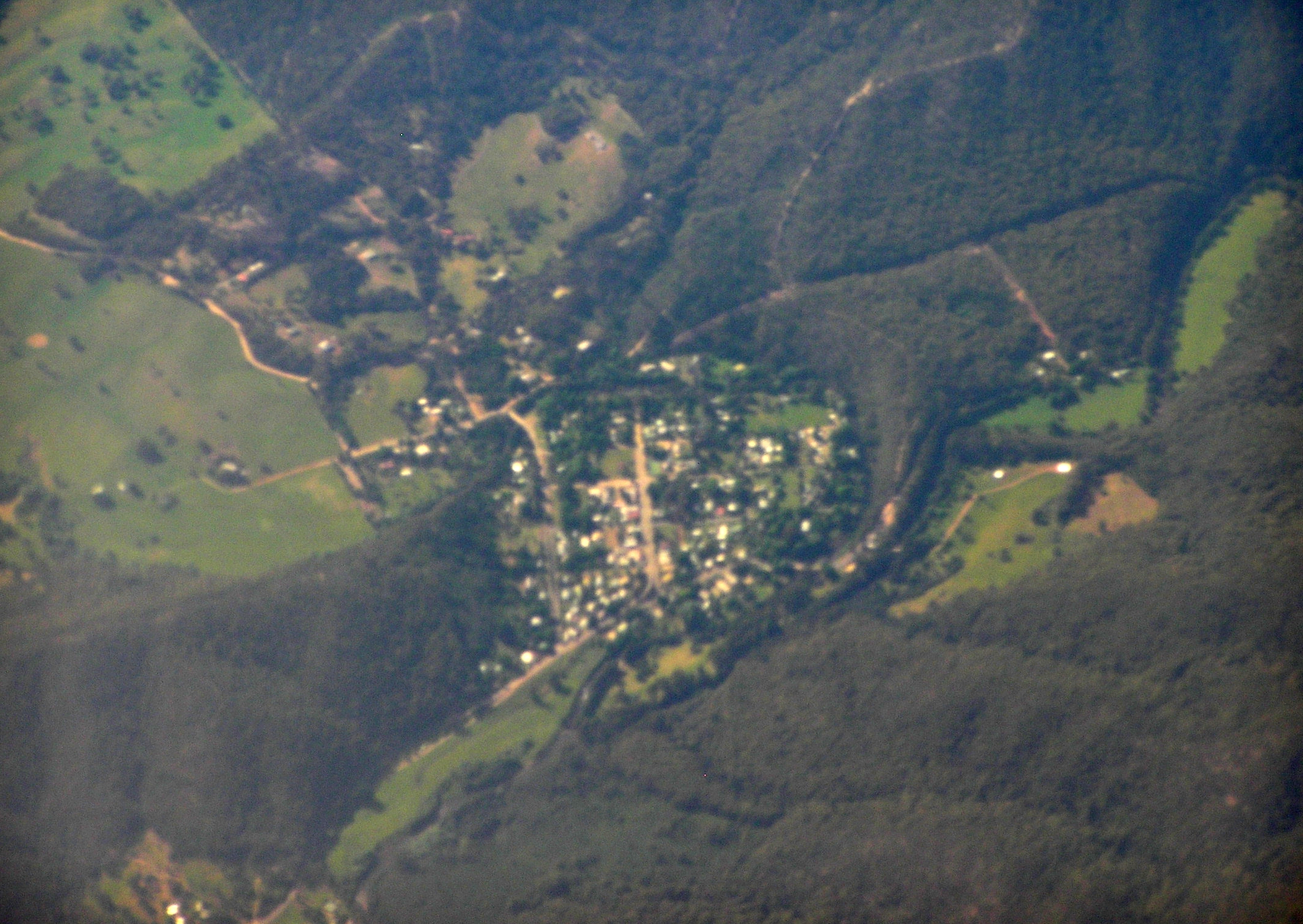
- Aerial photo from west

- Coordinates: 37°19′0″S 146°08′0″E
- Country: Australia
- State: Victoria
- Region: Hume
- LGA: Shire of Mansfield
- Location: 193 km (120 mi) NE of Melbourne; 36 km (22 mi) S of Mansfield

Government
  - State electorate: Eildon
  - Federal division: Indi

Population
  - Total: 382 (SAL 2021)
- Postcode: 3723
- Annual rainfall: 1,173.4 mm (46.20 in)

Jamieson is a town in Victoria, Australia. It is located at the junction of the Goulburn River and Jamieson River, 193 kilometres (120 mi) north-east of Melbourne. The name is believed to have been derived from George Jamieson, a shepherd who grazed sheep in the area in the 1850s. At the time of the 2021 census, Jamieson had a population of 382.

== History ==
The area was first settled in 1860 and by 1861 approximately 300 people were working the goldfields. According to the book Jamieson Founders and Families by Dr. Brian Lloyd, the first Post Office in the upper Goulburn district was at Mansfield in 1858. The first Post and Telegraph Office at Jamieson was on the west side of Bank Street. When the Oriental Bank closed down in 1865, the Post Office was moved across the street to occupy the bank building. The Post Office at its current location in Perkins St was from about 1872.

The town site was surveyed in 1862, and a borough council was established in 1864. By 1865 the town had a Catholic chapel, an Anglican church, a school, a courthouse and police station, two banks, two insurance offices, five hotels, and several stores. Jamieson reached its peak in the 1870s, but a sharp decline soon followed. Most mining operations had ceased by the beginning of the First World War, and Black Friday bushfires destroyed many mine workings in 1939.

By the 1990s, the town had become a popular tourist destination, boosted by Lake Eildon (situated adjacent to the Jamieson township and formed by the damming of the Goulburn River) reaching 100% capacity in 1996. However, the tourism industry suffered in the early 2000s following a drought that affected Lake Eildon. In March 2007, the capacity of the lake reached a historic low of 7.9%.

The Jamieson Magistrates' Court closed on 1 January 1983.

== Jamieson today ==
Jamieson has a permanent population of around 250. It is a popular destination for four wheel drive enthusiasts, fishers, and amateur gold diggers. It is close to Lake Eildon and the Mount Buller snowfields. The town has two hotels, a caravan park, and several bed and breakfast establishments.

== 2006-07 Victorian Bushfires ==
In December 2006, Victoria's North-East was affected by many bushfires that threatened to merge into fewer, but bigger fire fronts. Jamieson was one town at the centre of attention during these times, used as a major post for firefighters and media (Free-to-Air, Pay TV, and newspaper journalists were based in the town). Luckily for Jamieson, fire breaks helped the Mount Terrible fire stay away from the town centre. It was also helped by a late Southerly Change that brought rain. However, a short distance, both East and South East (Jamieson-Licola and Mansfield-Woods Point Roads) of the town were burnt in the blaze.
