= Roseneath Cottage =

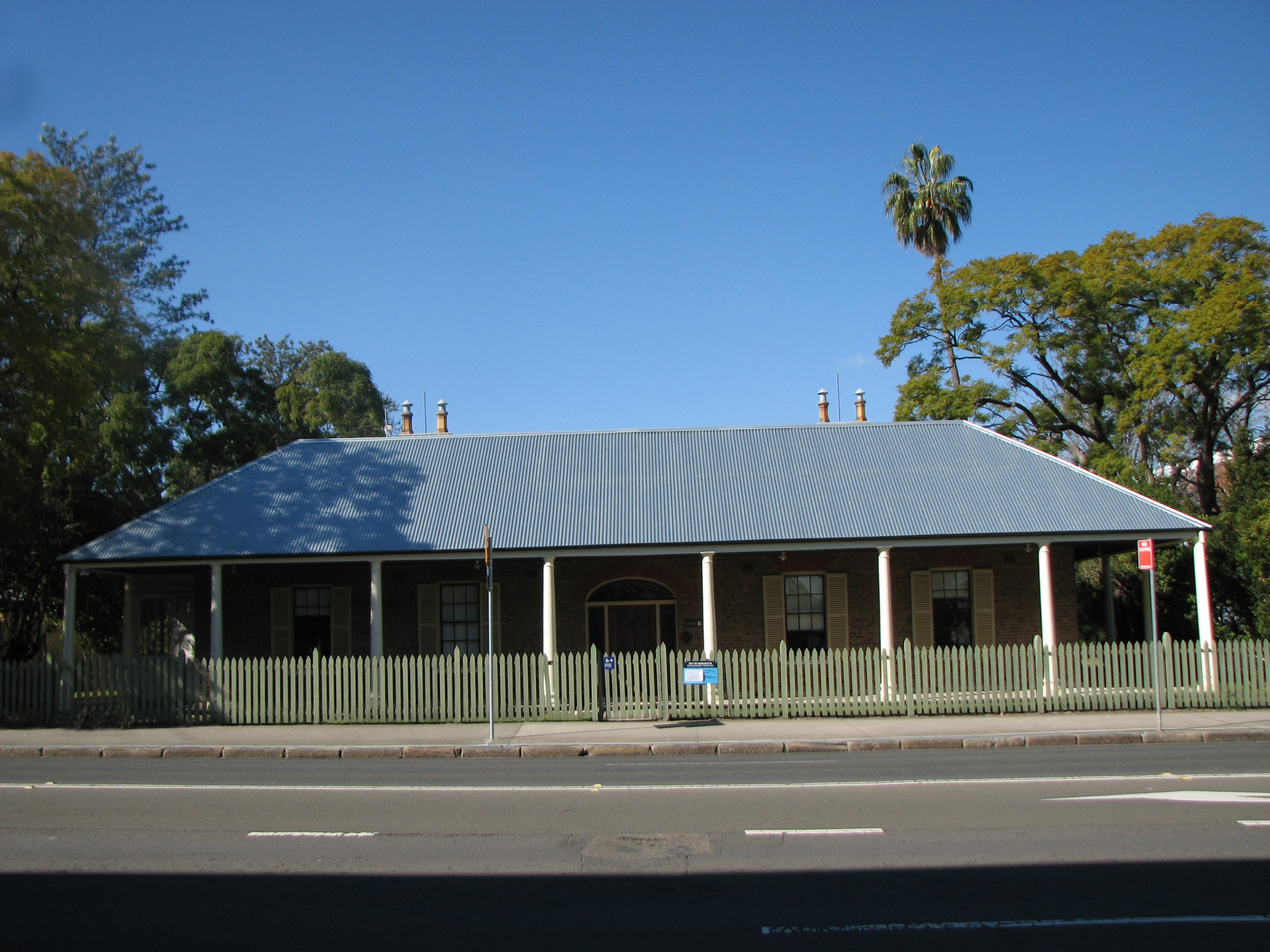
- Roseneath Cottage, 40–42 O'Connell Street, Parramatta

- Location within Sydney Location within Australia
- 33°48′25″S 151°00′09″E
- Location: 40–42 O'Connell Street, Parramatta, City of Parramatta, New South Wales, Australia

History
- Built: c. 1835

Site notes
- Owner: Privately owned

New South Wales Heritage Register
- Official name: Roseneath Cottage
- Type: State heritage (built)
- Designated: 2 April 1999
- Reference no.: 42
- Type: House
- Category: Residential buildings (private)

Roseneath Cottage is a heritage-listed former residence and now school building at 40–42 O'Connell Street, Parramatta, City of Parramatta, New South Wales, Australia. It was added to the New South Wales State Heritage Register on 2 April 1999.

== History ==
=== Indigenous history ===
Aboriginal people have inhabited the Australian continent for at least 60,000 years and the area around Sydney for at least 25,000 years. The traditional owners of the Parramatta locality are the Burramatta, who are part of the wider grouping of Darug peoples across Western Sydney. The name Parramatta is a distortion of Burramatta, and refers to "Burra" – eel and "matta" – creek. Evidence of Aboriginal occupation of land close to Roseneath Cottage remains in nearby Parramatta Park in the form of several scarred trees and artefact scatters.

=== Early Colonial history ===
In 1806 Governor Philip Gidley King made three generous but improper grants of land to the incoming Governor, William Bligh in August of that year. One of these grants was 42 hectares (105 acres) 'near Parramatta' and included the present site of Roseneath Cottage. Bligh's grant was rescinded by Governor Macquarie in 1819, nullified along with the other two grants given to Bligh by Governor King in 1806.

On 12 January 1832, William Tuckwell was named as the grantee of Lot 12 Section 10 in North Parramatta, the lot on which Roseneath Cottage is now sited. However neither the grant nor the lot number were finalised, likely because of financing problems. Primary Application 15392 shows that between 1831 and 1834 Tuckwell was engaged in a complex variety of translations in relation to Lot 12, probably trying to raise the necessary finances for its purchase. For most of his working life from 1818, Tuckwell was employed at the nearby Parramatta Female Factory, including a short stint as its superintendent.

On 7 March 1833, a grant of land (Lot 11 Section 10, land on which the eastern part of Roseneath Cottage's garden is still situated). Harvey was also granted lots 10 and 14 within this section and paid 19 pounds 4 shillings for all three. Lot 10 Section 11 in Parramatta was given to Henry Harvey listed as "of Parramatta" - bounded on the south side by Ross Street. Harvey was a baker convicted and transported to NSW for seven years in 1817. He became a successful businessman and built a substantial four-storey steam mill on the banks of the Parramatta River in 1840–41, around the same time as he was granted Lot 11 Section 10 nearby.

==== Ownership by the Templeton family ====
In 1834 Harvey started selling Roseneath Cottage's lot to wealthy Scottish widow Janet Templeton, making a "release of equity of redemption" to her, presumably giving her control over Lot 12 Section 10, the land on which most of Roseneath Cottage is now sited. After the death of her husband, Andrew Templeton, a Glasgow banker, she had chartered a brig "the Czar", of 640 tonnes (700 short tons) and set sail for Australia in 1830. She brought with her eight children and seven Scottish servants.

Templeton's sister-in-law, Eliza Forlong(e), pioneered her son's importation of top quality Saxon merinos to Van Diemen's Land at "Winton", near Ross, in 1829, with financial help from Templeton's husband, then when Janet's husband died Eliza helped her to pack up her extensive Scottish household together with another Merino flock selected by Eliza, bound for NSW on "The Czar" in 1831. Eliza made several trips on foot through Germany (Saxony) collecting wool sheep flocks to bring out to Australia - by 1835 she removed to Australia Felix (Western Victoria) as Tasmania had no decent land offering. Mrs Templeton is known to have settled in Van Diemen's Land at "Kenilworth" in the Midlands and later at "Kelburn" in the Goulburn district of New South Wales and then later crossing the Murray River to Port Phillip.

Janet Templeton (c. 1790–1857) had brought her eight children, seven Scottish servants, limited capital and a small flock of 63 Saxon merino sheep purchased in Leipzig, central Germany to Australia, as she intended to become a pastoralist. She was one of the first women in Australia to become a breeder of these sheep. After landing in Sydney early in January 1831 as a free settler widow, she took up residence in Concord and soon after made application for a grant of land. After her son John appeared before the Land Board twice in 1831 she was directed to apply for a grant of 1,070 hectares (2,650 acres) which she selected about 16 kilometres (10 mi) from Goulburn and on which the sheep were depastured. The native name of this spot was Conchipmolong; in the deed the grant was called "Kelburn". She was living at Concord until 1835 or 1836. In 1835 Mrs Templeton bought the land (Lot 13 in Allotment 10), on 31 August 1835. The Roseneath Cottage property encompassed land from this lot during the 19th century when the cottage was surrounded by extensive landscaping. This lot was later subdivided off and neighbouring cottages facing O'Connell Street built here on which Roseneath was built and another block in the same section. The house appears to have been built soon after the land was bought. The building was certainly standing in 1837 because her third daughter Marion was married there to her cousin William Forlonge.

In 1836 Harvey leased lots adjacent to Roseneath Cottage to Templeton. On 3 and 5 December that year he "leased" and "released" land from Section 10 to her. This probably refers to Lot 11 at least, part of which is now included in the contemporary Roseneath Cottage property.

By conveyance in July 1837, Mrs Templeton acquired Henry Harvey's grant. In 1837 Roseneath was described as 'dignified and unpretentious. The wide, panelled front door is surmounted by a fanlight enhanced by an arc in brickwork above it. On either side of the door are two large shuttered windows which, like it, surmounted by patterned brickwork. A 3 sided verandah was included under the main shingled roof and upheld by wooden columns. The hall, 12 feet wide, ran the length of the house and a steep narrow staircase led up to the attics which comprised 2 large bedrooms and one smaller. There were 5 rooms on the ground floor; the parlour, dining room and Janet's bedroom were large and their mantelpieces had flat, fluted supports. There were also 2 minor bedrooms'. "At the rear were the kitchen quarters, stables and a coach-house. The cottage overlooked the Domain and, on either side, was a good piece of ground where Janet made a garden planting shrubs and fruit trees, including oranges, apples, pears, plums, apricots and peaches, nectarines, vines and mulberries. A well was sunk in the yard to provide water".

In 1837 a Templeton family wedding was held at Roseneath Cottage. The "Sydney Herald" reported the marriage of the "third daughter of the late Andrew Templeton Esq." to A. M. William Furlonge at "Roseneath Cottage, Parramatta". Marion Templeton married her first cousin William Forlonge. This is the first published use of the name "Roseneath", suggesting the house was built by this date and that the Templeton family were living there. In 1838 there is mention of Mrs Templeton of Concord, Parramatta. The Templetons became interested in the pastoral industry in the Port Phillip district in 1838 when John, at 21, took up a station then known as "Seven Creeks", about 56 kilometres (35 mi) from the Goulburn River. She is believed to have been responsible for the introduction of merino sheep into Victoria (of the Forlange breed).

Although Macquarie nullified Governor Bligh's Parramatta grant in 1819, in 1839 Bligh's daughter and heir, Mary O'Connell, attempted to reclaim it and evicted residents from the houses built north of the river, including Roseneath Cottage. The issue was only resolved in 1841 when the Bligh heirs surrendered their claim to the land in return for confirmation of other land grants.

In 1840 Roseneath was tenanted by Major Edward Darvall and family who found it 'remote from domestic conveniences. Their servants were a black Portuguese cook who spoke little English and a "lazy wild Irish girl" as housemaid. Convict Parramatta was evident with an iron gang of 200-300 men passing Roseneath Cottage every day. Emily Darvall recorded in a letter: "The cottage stands in a little garden...is brick but the colour is hardly to be distinguished owing to the beautiful creepers that surround it hanging in thick festoons from column to column of the verandah which makes a delightfully cool walk round three sides. Ivy, passion flowers, bignonia, honey-suckle and may others all growing most luxuriantly - while the beds are filled will (sic: with) geraniums and roses"...The kitchen and officers are in a detached building behind but with a covered communication. The extreme quiet of this spot is its principal charm in my eyes'. Also that year, a newspaper reported "John Williams, a runaway convict was indicted for burglariously entering the dwelling house of Janet Templeton at Parramatta, on 6th December, and stealing from there sundry articles. Guilty - to be transported for 15 years".

In May 1842 the Sydney Herald noted the death of a tenant at Roseneath Cottage, Mrs William Blair, suggesting the place was rented.

In 1842 and 1843 Mrs Templeton advertised Roseneath; 'To Let: At Parramatta, Roseneath Cottage, lately the residence of Mrs Templeton. The house is described in the advertisement as 'situated in O'Connell Street and contains large dining and drawing rooms, and six bedrooms, besides detached kitchen, laundry store, servants' apartments, stable and coach-house. There is an excellent garden, well-stocked with fruit trees, and a variety of beautiful shrubs, also a well of excellent water'.

Historian Rachel Roxburgh suggests this sale is a sign of Templeton's increasing financial difficulties, probably associated with the nationwide recession at that time. In March 1843 she mortgaged her Parramatta properties and rural holdings for 3500 pounds to Scottish-born agents John Gilchrist and John Alexander. Within a year, in January 1844, her estate was sequestrated. The Parramatta properties were not released for another two years and then not successfully sold for another six years. In February and August 1843 the Sydney Herald ran advertisements for Roseneath Cottage. During the middle decades of the 19th century it passed through the hands of many owners, including: Robert Gordon, Richard Reeve, Gilchrist and Alexander, Finch, William Basset, Patrick Hogan, Joseph Caraher, J. Walker and E. M. Bobart. The house appeared to be mostly leased throughout the middle decades of the 19th century, rather than owner-occupied. From 1845 to 1855 at least it appeared to be leased by Mr Ardagh, who commenced a boarding school there. It was still operating in 1855, under a M. R. Baly.

On 22 August 1844 the Sydney Herald carried a further advertisement this time advertising Roseneath Cottage, "at present occupied by Mrs Colonel Anderson", to be let or sold. The house was put up for sale again in May 1849.

==== Ownerships in the latter part of the nineteenth century ====
From 1852 Roseneath was bought by Charles Wray Finch, with six other parcels of adjacent land from Templeton's mortgagees, Gilchrist and Alexander. Finch was a businessman who later served as a member of the New South Wales Legislative Council. In 1854 he sold them to William Frederick Bassett, a medical practitioner and educationist, for a significant profit, suggesting Finch had built on the blocks or made major improvements to Roseneath.

In 1856 Rev. E. M. Bobart bought Roseneath Cottage. E.M. was Elizabeth Mary Bobart, wife of Henry Hodgkinson Bobart, rector at St. John's Anglican Church, Parramatta. She was also daughter of the Rev. Samuel Marsden, one of the colony's key figures. In 1857 the Bobarts had a son, born at Roseneath Cottage.

Janet Templeton and Eliza Forlonge are not actually buried together. Janet Templeton died in 1857 and was buried in the Church of England section at St Kilda Cemetery in Melbourne. There is a `933 granite memorial (in the form of a wool bale) to both Eliza (referred to as "Mrs John Forlonge") and to "Mrs Janet Templeton" at the family's property, Seven Creeks, Euroa. But Janet is definitely buried at St Kilda.

In 1861 Roseneath, property of Mrs Bobart, widow of Reverend H. H. Bobart, was sold by auction. suggests that this was a sale of goods, suggesting the Bobarts (he still living) were moving. The newspaper quoted the cottage as the residence of "Mrs Bobart".

From 1862 to 1863 the cottage became a ladies' boarding and day school premises again, under Mrs McGhie. In July 1863 and September 1868 the property was offered for lease and it is uncertain if it was privately leased or still run as a school in those years. A death notice was published in 1867 for Eleanor Allen, oldest daughter of the late T. D. Allen, at her residence (Roseneath). In 1869 a lease or sale advertisement ran in the Sydney Morning Herald. In August 1870 John Capbell bought Roseneath. In February 1872 William Goodin bought it and soon advertised it for lease. In 1875 another death notice ran in the Sydney Morning Herald, for Mrs S. M. Forrester, aged 35, at her residence.

An 1877 advertisement in The Sydney Morning Herald gave a detailed description of the property, including its 318' frontage to O'Connell Street (the entire block width north to Grose Street), 83' frontage to Ross Street, 62' frontage to Grose Street. From 1884 Sands Directory begins recording residents in Parramatta, showing James Firth, James Larcombe and James Garland each separately living at Roseneath between 1884 and 1888. In 1889 Mrs James Mills lived there. For perhaps the only recorded instance, it is not then called "Roseneath" but "St. Ronans", the name of the school located there.

From 1887 to 1889 Roseneath Cottage nurtured the seed for the Tara Anglican School for Girls, an institution still operating in Parramatta in 2016. When it was temporarily the site of 'St. Ronan's, a high class day and boarding school for girls, between 1887 and 1889, it is believed that sixteen year old Miss Mary Elizabeth (Joan) Waugh...began her teaching career in earnest (here), as it is likely she was the young accomplished governess referred to in a St. Ronan's advertisement in March 1888. She would go on to conduct morning classes for St. Ronan's young ladies almost a decade later at the school's George Street location, before moving her classes to her own family home, "Tara" in 1912, also in George Street.

From 1890 to 1899 Sands Directory records "R. C. Thorp, surgeon" as living at Roseneath. In 1891 it was bought by Mary Elizabeth Allen, daughter of William Goodin, five years after his death. She was the wife of Parramatta builder and alderman, Frederick George Allen.

=== Twentieth-century history ===
From 1903 to 1916 Sands Directory notes Mrs J. B. Hillis as living at Roseneath. "Granny Hillis" was grandmother of Marjory Davey, whose family owned Roseneath from 1909 to 1975. Mrs Hillis was living at Roseneath at least six years before the family purchased the property, in 1909. In that year Mrs Allen brought the property into Torrens Title. That year it was subdivided and the part with the cottage was sold to George Bayley Davey, newspaper reporter. The mortgage was not finalised until 1912. Davey was a foundation member of the Australian Journalists Association. Sands Directory suggests he was living next door since 1909, and only moved into Roseneath in 1917.

In May 1919 Davey subdivided the land, selling the northern portion to Arthur Lovedale Gates, engineer. Davey retained the residue and the resultant allotment of Roseneath Cottage remains in place today. In 1924 Roseneath was inherited by Margaret Davey, George's widow (he died in 1923), and she was recorded as its occupant until 1933 at least (when Sands Directories closed). In 1937 it was transferred from Margaret Davey to her daughter Marjory Nene Davey (later married to Arthur Lovedale Gates (who owned the residence to its north, 44 O'Connell Street) and then to Granville O'Conor).

In 1949 the NSW Institute of Architects and the National Trust of Australia both included Roseneath Cottage on their first heritage lists as worthy of preservation. By 1967 it was classified by the National Trust (NSW). During the Marjory Davey (married then to Arthur Gates), Roseneath was subdivided into two separate residences, a duplex. Works included introducing internal partition walls dividing the central hall and two front main rooms and rear infill building, as well as converting the rear kitchen wing into bathrooms. New kitchens were installed on either side of the rear infill building. The most dramatic aspect involved removal of the (single) front door and replacement with two front doors. At this time the property was re-numbered 40 and 42 O'Connell Street.

In 1954 Morton Herman published "Early Australian architects and their work", his classic text. Roseneath was included and he included architectural drawings of the houe including the (original) front door and some internal detailing. A floor plan was also included, although it is incorrect showing only four rooms and a central hall and not the actual five room configuration. UNSW architectural students John Mobbs and John Lake made architectural drawings of Roseneath in 1959, held in the Mitchell Library (which dates them incorrectly). Like Herman, his students drew the original front door as if it were still in place. They also left out the historic kitchen wing at the rear.

In 1960 Roseneath was listed in the Cumberland County Council's Register of Historic Buildings as a building worthy of preservation and proclaimed by the governor as a Historic Building under Clause 38 of the County of Cumberland Planning Scheme Ordinance. Being listed on this register meant firstly that alterations/demolition required the consent of Council, and secondly that Council may compulsorily acquire the property. No such attempt at resumption was made in relation to Roseneath Cottage. A photograph of its front verandah by Max Dupain was included in the 1963 exhibition held by the National Trust of Australia (NSW) titled 'No time to spare!: an exhibition of the newly released "A" list of buildings'.

In 1975 Roseneath was sold by the Davey family to Laurence Traverse Mear, security officer (d. 2006) and Joan Elvina Mear (d. 2014) who had been long-time neighbours, living at 40 O'Connell Street since the 1940s. Bruce Mear recalls the family finding archaeological relics in the late 1970s (when the shower was installed in the back, under the floor; and a circle of bricks in the ground in the area that was the orchid house, a brick wall and floor up near the phone box containing much 1800s rubbish (bottles, plates, knobs, pottery, etc.).

==== Conservation and protection ====
In 1975 the National Trust of Australia (NSW) Director John Morris wrote to Blanche Purcas of 8 Booroowa Street, Young asking for the 'original door, side lights and fan light from 'Roseneath' to be donated to the National Trust so that eventually they could be used for authentic restoration at Roseneath. When the house was divided into two flats the door had been saved and taken to Young to be attached to a house there. There is no known response to Morris' letter and it is likely that the original door is still on 8 Boorowa Street, Young. On 24 November 1978 an Interim Heritage Order was placed over Roseneath Cottage and it was listed on the Register of the National Estate. On 17 July 1981 a Permanent Conservation Order was placed over Roseneath Cottage. On 2 April 1999 Roseneath was transferred to the NSW State Heritage Register. (Heritage Office files). In 1989 Roseneath was locally listed on the schedule of heritage items of Parramatta Local Environmental Plan as 'Roseneath and potential archaeological site, no. I00042. In the 1980s the Mears undertook conservation works to both interior and exterior of Roseneath, following Laurence's retirement. The extent of works is unknown. A picket fence was erected in 1987, higher than usual due to security problems in the area, to a design by heritage architect Robert Moore. Also that year the Mears received a heritage award from the State Planning and Environment Minister, Bob Carr, along with state MP, Barry Wilde. In 1988 the northern half of Roseneath Cottage was occupied by a firm of solicitors, who converted it into commercial use "without making any structural alterations".

=== Recent history ===
In 2015 Roseneath Cottage was inherited by Joan and Laurence Mears' two children, Bruce Mear and Alison Cotter. In 2015 while the property was on the real estate market, the owners discovered a cache of concealed objects beneath the attic floor of the house. The cache consists of children's toys including marbles, wooden animals and a piece from a board game as well as assorted other items including handmade nails. In 2015 Roseneath Cottage was bought by Our Lady of Mercy College, its neighbour. Lucas Stapleton Johnson and Partners architects were engaged to undertake its restoration and adaptation and prepare a conservation management plan.

== Description ==
=== House ===
Roseneath is a single storied Georgian town house of very good architectural quality. A simple sandstock, brick colonial town cottage having a symmetrical street facade consisting of a central doorway with an elliptical fanlight, four twelve panel shuttered windows, turned timber columns and sandstone flagging to the verandah on three sides.

Above the doorway and windows are soft red rubbing brick lintels contrasting with the mottled fawn and grey sandstock brick of the walls. The three-sided columned verandah is under the same roof of the house. The interior is typical of the period. (Heritage Office files)

Built of mottled fawn and grey bricks, a feature of the house is the entrance door, 3 feet 5" wide, and with a finely traced fanlight. The doorway has now been altered, and a side verandah has been enclosed.

=== Garden ===
Roseneath sits on a corner lot, of O'Connell & Ross Streets. The main facade and front door face west onto O'Connell St. This front garden has a central path to the front door, flanking lawns with, planted against the verandah posts, a symmetrical pair of jade plants (Crassula arborescens), roses and a lobster plant (Bellerophone guttata).

To the south west are a number of trees and shrubs. A large jacaranda (Jacaranda mimosifolia) is near Ross St. with rock lilies (Dendrobium speciosum) perched up its trunk. A large Californian desert palm (Washingtonia robusta) dates probably from the late 19th century and a sweet bay laurel (Laurus nobilis) and Camellia japonica cv. are south of and close to the house. Near the southern fence is a tall hybrid kurrajong/Illawarra flame tree (Brachychiton populneum x B.acerifolium) covered in ivy (Hedera helix). A frangipani (Plumeria rubra cv.), Chinese hibiscus (Hibiscus rosa-sinensis cv.), cumquat (Fortunella sp.), horned holly (Ilex cornuta) tree, tree tulip (Magnolia soulangeana), are the main shrubs. To the south east are a heavenly bamboo (Nandina domestica), sweet pittosporum (Pittosporum undulatum) tree, Hydrangea macrophylla cv.s. A small brick path leads from the back door on the house's south-eastern side out to a side gate on Ross Street. The rear fence to the east has a covering of creeping fig (Ficus pumila .var.pumila) and ivy.

To the north west are another jacaranda tree, a bird-of-paradise flower (Strelitzia sp.), river lilies (Crinum sp.), a tree gardenia (Rothmannia globosa), Chinese wisteria (Wisteria sinensis) vine and a side lattice fence in poor condition. A simple drain with vertically laid bricks edging it runs from the northern side of the house west to O'Connell Street.

A line of shrubs runs along the northern perimeter fence north and rear of the house and over the trellis fence including Mickey Mouse plant (Ochna serrulata), port wine magnolia (Michelia figo), poinsettia (Euphorbia pulcherrima) bushes (several), New Zealand pittosporum (Pittosporum tenuifolium 'Variegata') and a grapefruit (Citrus x paradisi cv.). A lawn area is to the rear of the house on the north-east side.

== Heritage listing ==
Roseneath Cottage was built in 1837 for Janet Templeton. It is of significance for its historic association with this pioneer of the Australian wool industry who is believed to have been responsible for the introduction of the merino sheep to the colony of Victoria. Roseneath is also of aesthetic significance as a simple yet elegant sandstock brick colonial cottage, having a symmetrical street facade consisting of a central doorway with an elliptical fanlight, two twelve panelled shuttered windows, turned timber columns and sandstone flagging to the verandah on three sides. A well-proportioned house having a facade of unusual harmony and charm Roseneath is considered to be the best surviving example of a colonial town cottage exterior within the County of Cumberland. The building's heritage significance was early recognised when it was proclaimed to be "a place of historic interest" under the County of Cumberland Planning Scheme in 1960 and it was furthermore amongst the first fifty places in NSW to be listed under the Heritage Act 1977.

Roseneath Cottage was listed on the New South Wales State Heritage Register on 2 April 1999.
