= Royston River =

Royston
- Location of the Royston River mouth in Victoria
- Etymology: Perhaps after a Victorian State Electricity Commission employee or Brigadier John Robinson Royston; derived from Royston, Hertfordshire

Location
- Country: Australia
- State: Victoria
- Region: South Eastern Highlands bioregion (IBRA), Northern Country/North Central
- Local government area: Murrindindi

Physical characteristics
- Source: Victorian Alps, Great Dividing Range
  - location: below Lake Mountain
  - coordinates: 37°29′19″S 145°53′57″E
  - elevation: 1,390 m (4,560 ft)
- Mouth: confluence with the Rubicon River
  - location: Rubicon
  - coordinates: 37°19′36″S 145°51′42″E
  - elevation: 381 m (1,250 ft)
- Length: 19 km (12 mi)

Basin features
- River system: Goulburn Broken catchment, Murray-Darling basin

The Royston River, an inland perennial river of the Goulburn Broken catchment, part of the Murray-Darling basin, is located in the lower South Eastern Highlands bioregion and Northern Country/North Central regions of the Australian state of Victoria. The headwaters of the Royston River rise on the western slopes of the Victorian Alps and descend to flow into the Rubicon River.

== Location and features ==
The Royston River rises from the Great Dividing Range near Lake Mountain and below Royston Gap, and flows northwest, fueled by runoff from the Federation and Royston Ranges before reaching its confluence with the Rubicon River, near Rubicon. The river descends 1,010 metres (3,310 ft) over its 19-kilometre (12 mi) course.

The Royston Power Station, part of the Rubicon Hydroelectric Scheme, a small run-of-the-river hydroelectric scheme, is located at the mouth of the Royston River, where the river is impounded by a 48-metre (157 ft) concrete slab and buttress that diverts water into an aqueduct that carries water for 2 kilometres (1.2 mi) into the neighbouring Rubicon Valley to the Royston Power Station forebay. The Royston Power Station has a capacity of 0.8 megawatts (1,100 hp). Water from the power station outlet discharges into the Rubicon aqueduct about halfway along its length. The Scheme is on the Victorian Heritage Register and the Register of the National Estate.

The river is not readily accessible nor heavily fished in its lower reaches. Brown trout, at an average of 70 grams (2.5 oz) with the occasional fish to 600 grams (21 oz) predominate, as well as some rainbow trout and river blackfish.

== Etymology ==
The name of the river is thought to be named by the Victorian State Electricity Commission after an employee. An alternate theory suggests that the river was named in honour of Brigadier John Robinson Royston, a South African who led Australian troops in the Boer War and the First World War. The name of the river is ultimately derived from Royston, Hertfordshire.

== See also ==
- List of rivers of Australia § Victoria
