= Rubicon Hydroelectric Scheme =

Hydroelectric scheme in Victoria, Australia

Incline for the Rubicon Power Station

The former Sugarloaf Power Station on Lake Eildon

The Rubicon Hydroelectric Scheme is a small run-of-the-river hydroelectric scheme located on the Rubicon and Royston Rivers, north east of Melbourne, 40 km (25 mi) south-west of Alexandra, Victoria, Australia. The scheme commenced in 1922, and was the first state-owned hydroelectric scheme to generate electricity in mainland Australia, and among the first in the world to be remotely controlled. For the first ten years of its operation it supplied on average 16.9% of electricity generated by the State Electricity Commission of Victoria. It is now owned and operated by AGL Energy and contributes approximately 0.02% of Victoria's energy supply.

== History ==
In the 1920s, the State Electricity Commission of Victoria investigated hydroelectric power generation, in parallel with work on brown coal-fired power stations at Yallourn. In 1922, a report was delivered by Messrs J.M. and H.E. Coane relating to the development of potential hydro-electric power on the Goulburn River and the Cerberean Range. Their findings were submitted to the Parliament of Victoria for funding, with the more cost effective project approved in 1922.

Known as the Sugarloaf – Rubicon Project, the initial plan involved five power stations, with total turbine capacity of 25,800 horsepower (19.2 MW). It was to be the largest power scheme on the State Rivers and Water Supply Commission of Victoria's ongoing construction of the Sugarloaf storage reservoir for irrigation. Greatly enlarged in the 1950s, the reservoir is now called Lake Eildon. The four other power stations comprised two on the Rubicon, one on the Royston, and one on Snobs Creek. The plans were later altered, with the Snobs Creek station being deleted, and an additional station provided at Rubicon Falls, bringing the installed turbine capacity to over 35,000 horsepower (26 MW). The Sugarloaf Power Station generated electricity during the irrigation season from October to April, when water released from the dam could also be used for power generation. The other four power stations were used during the wetter seasons of winter and spring.

Work started in 1922 and, by 1928, the mountain stream section of the project was complete, with the Sugarloaf power station on the Eildon Weir following in 1929. Rubicon 'A' power station has a pipeline with a 1,455-foot (443 m) drop over its 4,280-foot (1,305 m) length. That station remotely controlled the other ones in the project. Minor enlargements were carried out at one station in 1954–55.

In the 1950s, the 13.5-megawatt (18,100 hp) Sugarloaf Power Station on the Goulburn River was replaced by the larger Eildon Power Station, after the weir was replaced by a much higher dam wall at the same site. The turbines were upgraded and reused.

== Details of the Rubicon Hydroelectric Scheme ==
Today, the scheme consists of three small run-of-river dams, four power stations, and associated raceways and penstocks. The total generating capacity of the scheme is approximately 13 megawatts, which is achieved during the winter months.

=== Royston Power Station ===
Royston Power Station
- Interactive map of Royston Power Station
- Country: Australia
- Location: Victoria
- Coordinates: 37°22′26″S 145°51′53″E
- Status: Operational
- Operator: AGL Energy

Reservoir
- Creates: Royston Dam

Power Station
- Installed capacity: 0.8 MW (1,100 hp)

The Royston Dam is a 48-metre (157 ft) concrete slab and buttress on the Royston River. It diverts water into an aqueduct that carries water for 2 kilometres (1.2 mi) into the neighbouring Rubicon Valley to the Royston Power Station forebay. The Royston penstock consists of 900 feet (270 m) of woodstave pipe on the upper section and 916 feet (279 m) of steel pipe on the lower section. The lower part of the woodstave section is now encased in concrete. The Royston Power Station has a capacity of 0.8 megawatts (1,100 hp). Water from the power station outlet discharges into the Rubicon aqueduct about halfway along its length.

Component	Location	Notes
Royston Dam	37°22′42″S 145°53′9″E	158-foot (48 m) concrete slab and buttress dam
Royston aqueduct	37°22′37″S 145°52′43″E	6,700 feet (2,000 m)
Royston Power Station forebay	37°22′28″S 145°52′16″E	
Royston Power Station penstock	37°22′29″S 145°52′5″E	30-inch (76 cm) diameter. 900 feet (270 m) of woodstave pipe on the upper section and 916 feet (279 m) of steel pipe on the lower section.
Royston Power Station	37°22′26″S 145°51′53″E	0.8 MW

=== Rubicon Power Station ===
Rubicon Power Station
- Interactive map of Rubicon Power Station
- Country: Australia
- Location: Victoria
- Coordinates: 37°19′38″S 145°51′38″E
- Status: Operational
- Operator: AGL Energy

Reservoir
- Creates: Rubicon Dam

Power Station
- Pump-generators: 2
- Pumps: Single-jet Pelton wheel generators
- Installed capacity: 9.2 MW (12,300 hp)

The Rubicon Dam is a 64-metre (210 ft) concrete-arch dam on the Rubicon River. It diverts water into the Rubicon aqueduct for 3.4 kilometres (2.1 mi) to the site of the Royston Power Station, where it collects the water diverted through the power station from the Royston River. It then travels a further 5.4 kilometres (3.4 mi) to the Rubicon Power Station forebay. The Rubicon penstock has a 443-metre (1,453 ft) drop over its 1,305-metre (4,281 ft) length. The Rubicon Power Station has two 4.6-megawatt (6,200 hp) horizontal single-jet Pelton wheel generators.

Component	Location	Notes
Rubicon Dam	37°23′29″S 145°51′2″E	210-foot (64 m) concrete arch dam
Rubicon aqueduct	37°22′29″S 145°51′40″E	11,300 feet (3,400 m) from Rubicon Dam to site of Royston Power Station
Rubicon aqueduct	37°20′56″S 145°51′23″E	17,600 feet (5,400 m) from Royston Power Station to Rubicon Forebay
Rubicon Power Station forebay	37°20′16″S 145°51′22″E	
Rubicon Power Station penstock	37°19′59″S 145°51′23″E	
Rubicon Power Station	37°19′38″S 145°51′38″E	9.2 MW, 2 turbines

=== Lower Rubicon Power Station ===
Lower Rubicon Power Station
- Interactive map of Lower Rubicon Power Station
- Country: Australia
- Location: Victoria
- Coordinates: 37°18′10″S 145°50′45″E
- Status: Operational
- Operator: AGL Energy

Power Station
- Installed capacity: 2.7 MW (3,600 hp)

Water discharged from the Rubicon Power Station flows along a 3.2 kilometres (2.0 mi) aqueduct, then through a 320-metre (1,050 ft), 51-inch (1,300 mm) diameter penstock to the Lower Rubicon Power Station. This comprises a single 2.6-megawatt (3,500 hp) horizontal generator. The discharge water from the power station is returned to the Rubicon River.

Component	Location	Notes
Lower Rubicon aqueduct	37°18′42″S 145°50′58″E	10,500 feet (3,200 m)
Lower Rubicon Power Station forebay	37°18′20″S 145°50′42″E	
Lower Rubicon Power Station penstock	37°18′17″S 145°50′43″E	1,045 feet (319 m) of 51-inch (1,300 mm) diameter riveted steel pipeline
Lower Rubicon Power Station	37°18′10″S 145°50′45″E	2.7 MW, 1 turbine

=== Rubicon Falls Power Station ===
Rubicon Falls Power Station
- Interactive map of Rubicon Falls Power Station
- Country: Australia
- Location: Victoria
- Coordinates: 37°20′24″S 145°50′52″E
- Status: Operational
- Operator: AGL Energy

Reservoir
- Creates: Rubicon Falls Dam

Power Station
- Pump-generators: 1
- Pumps: Horizontal twin-jet Pelton wheel
- Installed capacity: 0.3 MW (400 hp)

The Rubicon Falls Dam is on the Rubicon River below the Rubicon Dam. It diverts water around the Rubicon Falls into the Rubicon Falls Power Station through a 420-metre (1,380 ft) penstock. The power station has a single 0.3-megawatt (400 hp) horizontal twin-jet Pelton wheel.

Component	Location	Notes
Rubicon Falls Dam	37°20′35″S 145°51′0″E	106-foot (32 m) concrete slab and buttress dam
Rubicon Falls Power Station penstock	37°20′30″S 145°50′57″E	1,400-foot (430 m) reinforced-concrete and steel pipeline
Rubicon Falls Power Station	37°20′24″S 145°50′52″E	0.3 MW, 1 turbine

=== Tramway ===
A 2-foot (610 mm)-gauge steel tramway was built for construction access between Rubicon Power Station and Rubicon Dam, with timber trestle bridges at Fifteen Thousand Foot Siphon, Royston Power Station, Beech Creek and Lubra Creek. The tramway remained in operation until the 1990s. An additional tramway was built for construction of the Royston power station and dam, and removed on completion.

The trestle bridges were replaced after their destruction in the 1939 Black Friday bushfires, and were again replaced as part of a maintenance program in 1960s. The Royston and Lubra Creek bridges were replaced in 1987 and 1991 respectively. The Beech Creek bridge was destroyed in February 2009 by the Murrindindi Mill fire, one of the Black Saturday bushfires. The Victorian Government agreed to rebuild the bridge in October 2011.

Component	Location	Notes
15000 foot trestle bridge	37°22′15″S 145°51′49″E	15,000 feet (4.6 km) along aqueduct
Beech Creek trestle bridge	37°23′14″S 145°51′45″E	Destroyed in 2009 Black Saturday bushfires
Lubra Creek trestle bridge	37°23′22″S 145°51′37″E	

== Heritage values ==
The Scheme is on the Victorian Heritage Register and the Register of the National Estate, and the surrounding state forest is set aside for its protection. The historical significance of the scheme is increased by its century of continuous use in essentially original form.

== See also ==
- List of power stations in Victoria
