= Acacia daviesii =

Timbertop wattle

Scientific classification
- Kingdom: Plantae
- Clade: Tracheophytes
- Clade: Angiosperms
- Clade: Eudicots
- Clade: Rosids
- Order: Fabales
- Family: Fabaceae
- Subfamily: Caesalpinioideae
- Clade: Mimosoid clade
- Genus: Acacia
- Species: A. daviesii

Binomial name
- Acacia daviesii Bartolome
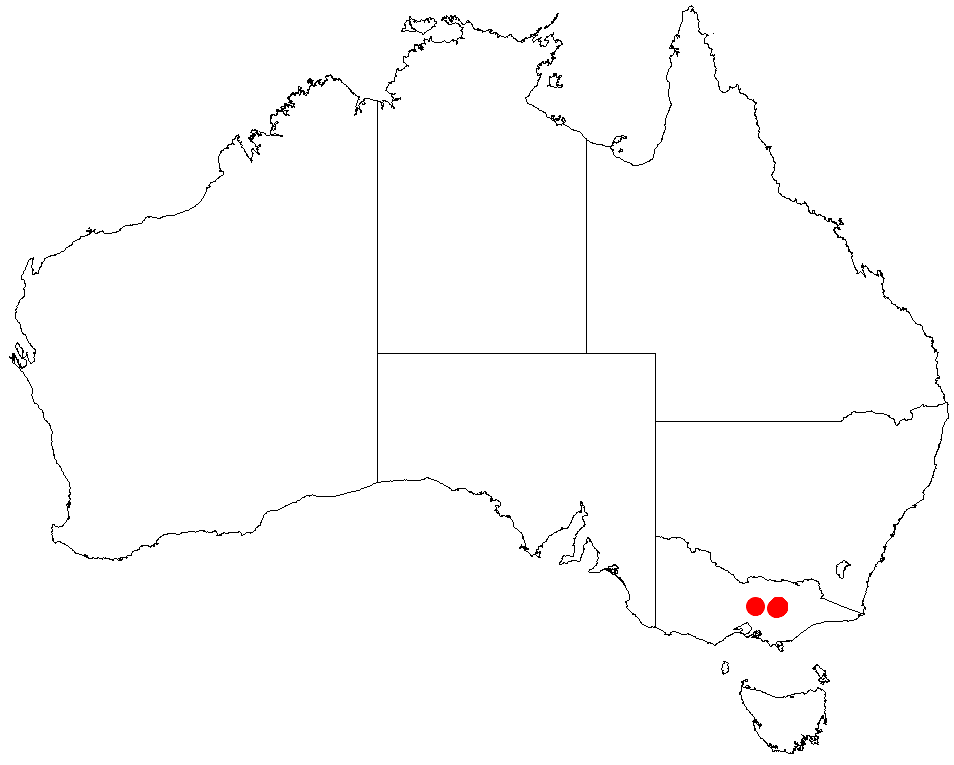
- Occurrence data from AVH

Synonyms
- Racosperma daviesii (M.Bartolome) Pedley

Species of legume

Acacia daviesii, commonly known as Timbertop wattle, is a species of flowering plant in the family Fabaceae and is endemic to a restricted part of Victoria, Australia. It is a shrub with pendulous branchlets, broadly elliptic to more or less circular phyllodes, spherical heads of golden yellow flowers and oblong, slightly curved pods.

== Description ==
Acacia daviesii is a shrub that typically grows to a height of up to 2.5 m (8 ft 2 in), forms dense stands from root suckers, and has erect stems. Its branchlets are usually pendulous and covered with short, soft hairs. Its phyllodes are broadly elliptic to almost circular, 3–10 mm (0.12–0.39 in) long and 2–8 mm (0.079–0.315 in) wide with prominent glandular hairs on the edges and veins. There is a gland 0.4–1.2 mm (0.016–0.047 in) above the base of the phyllodes and one or two prominent veins. The flowers are borne in a spherical head in axils on a peduncle 2.5–9 mm (0.098–0.354 in) long, each head with 12 to 22 golden yellow flowers. Flowering has been recorded in October, and the pods are oblong, slightly curved, 7–30 mm (0.28–1.18 in) long and 1.7–3.8 mm (0.067–0.150 in) wide.

== Taxonomy ==
Acacia daviesii was first formally described in 2002 by Marisa Bartolome, Neville Walsh, Elizabeth James and Pauline Ladiges in Australian Systematic Botany, from specimens Bartolome collected about 21 km (13 mi) south-east of Mansfield in 2000. The specific epithet (daviesii) "honours Mr Geoff Davies who discovered the species and assisted in the field".

== Distribution and habitat ==
Timbertop wattle is endemic to a small area in central Victoria and is only found at a few of sites to the south east of Mansfield around the Howqua River and Mount Timbertop where it can form dense stands of plants only known to reproduce by root-suckering. It grows in dry open Eucalyptus woodland and forest.

== Conservation status ==
Acacia daviesii is listed as "critically endangered" under the Victorian Government Flora and Fauna Guarantee Act 1988.

== See also ==
- List of Acacia species
