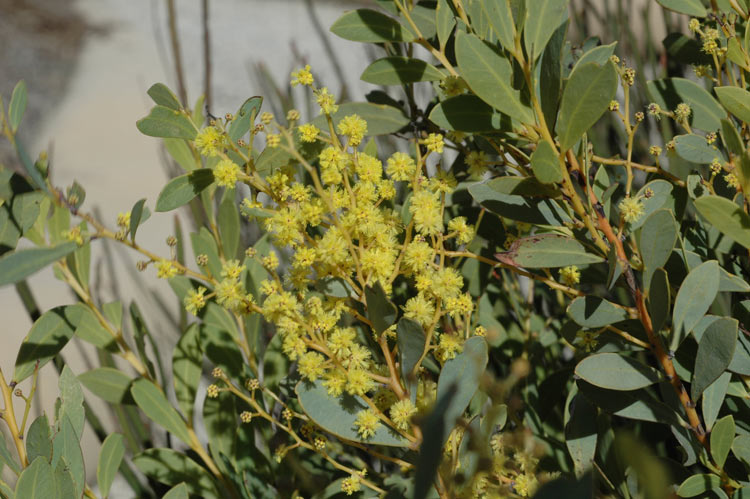
- In the Cranbourne Botanic Gardens

Scientific classification
- Kingdom: Plantae
- Clade: Embryophytes
- Clade: Tracheophytes
- Clade: Spermatophytes
- Clade: Angiosperms
- Clade: Eudicots
- Clade: Rosids
- Order: Fabales
- Family: Fabaceae
- Subfamily: Caesalpinioideae
- Clade: Mimosoid clade
- Genus: Acacia
- Species: A. sporadica

Binomial name
- Acacia sporadica N.G.Walsh
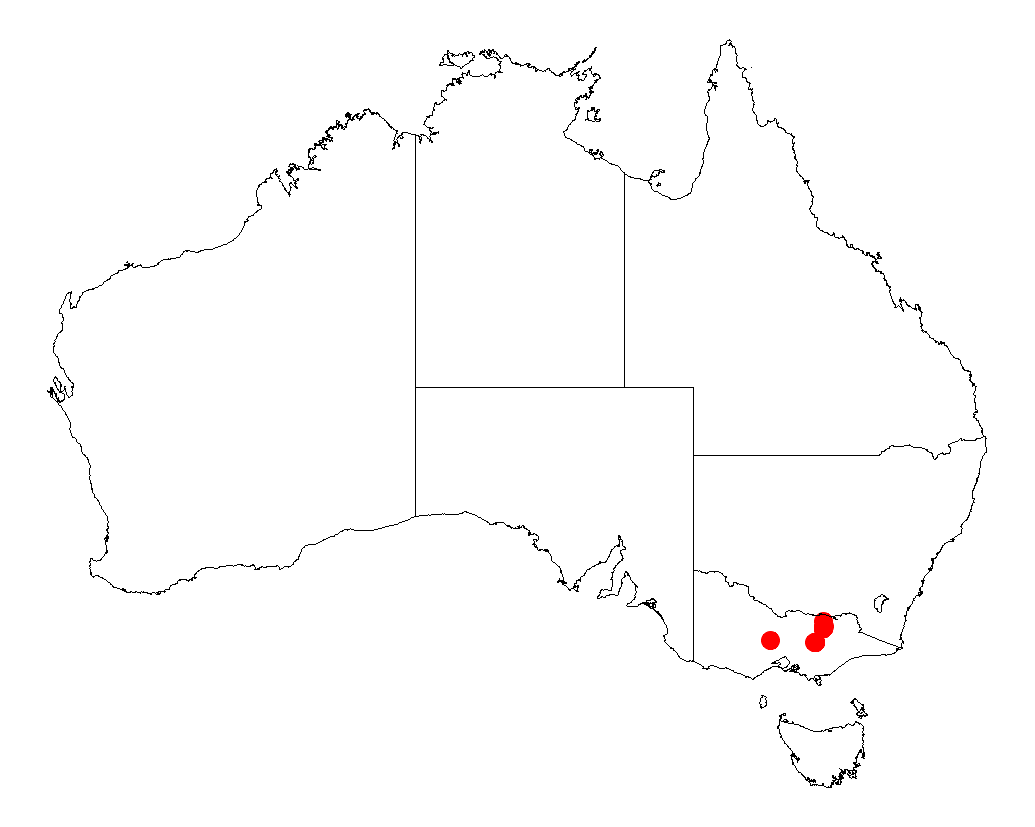
- Occurrence data from AVH

= Acacia sporadica =

Species of legume

Acacia sporadica, also commonly known as the pale hickory wattle, is a shrub of the genus Acacia and the subgenus Phyllodineae that is native to a small area in Victoria, Australia.

== Description ==
The root suckering shrub typically grows to a height of around 3 m (9.8 ft) and has glabrous branchlets. Like most species of Acacia it has phyllodes rather than true leaves. The evergreen blue-green and glabrous phyllodes have an asymmetric obovate to oblanceolate shape that can sometimes be almost elliptic. The phyllodes have a length of 2.5 to 6.5 cm (0.98 to 2.56 in) and a width of 7 to 32 mm (0.28 to 1.26 in) and have a prominent midrib and marginal nerves.

== Taxonomy ==
The species was first formally described by the botanist Neville Walsh in 2004 as part of the work Two new wattles endemic to Victoria as published in the journal Muelleria.

== Distribution ==
It has a disjunct distribution from around the Howqua River, and Carboor East and in areas close to Taradale where it is often situated on rocky hills as a part of woodlands or Eucalyptus forest communities.

== See also ==
- List of Acacia species
