= Stave (wood) =

Strips of wood used to make barrels and other circular wooden objects

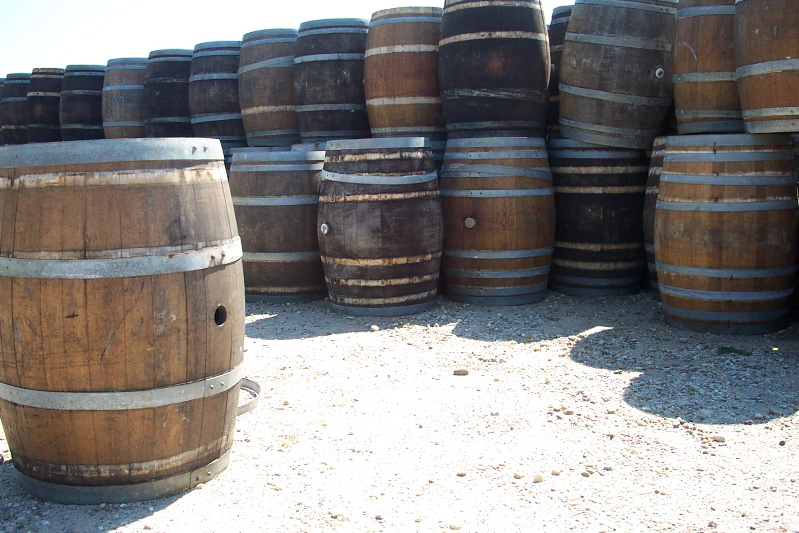
Wooden barrels made of multiple staves

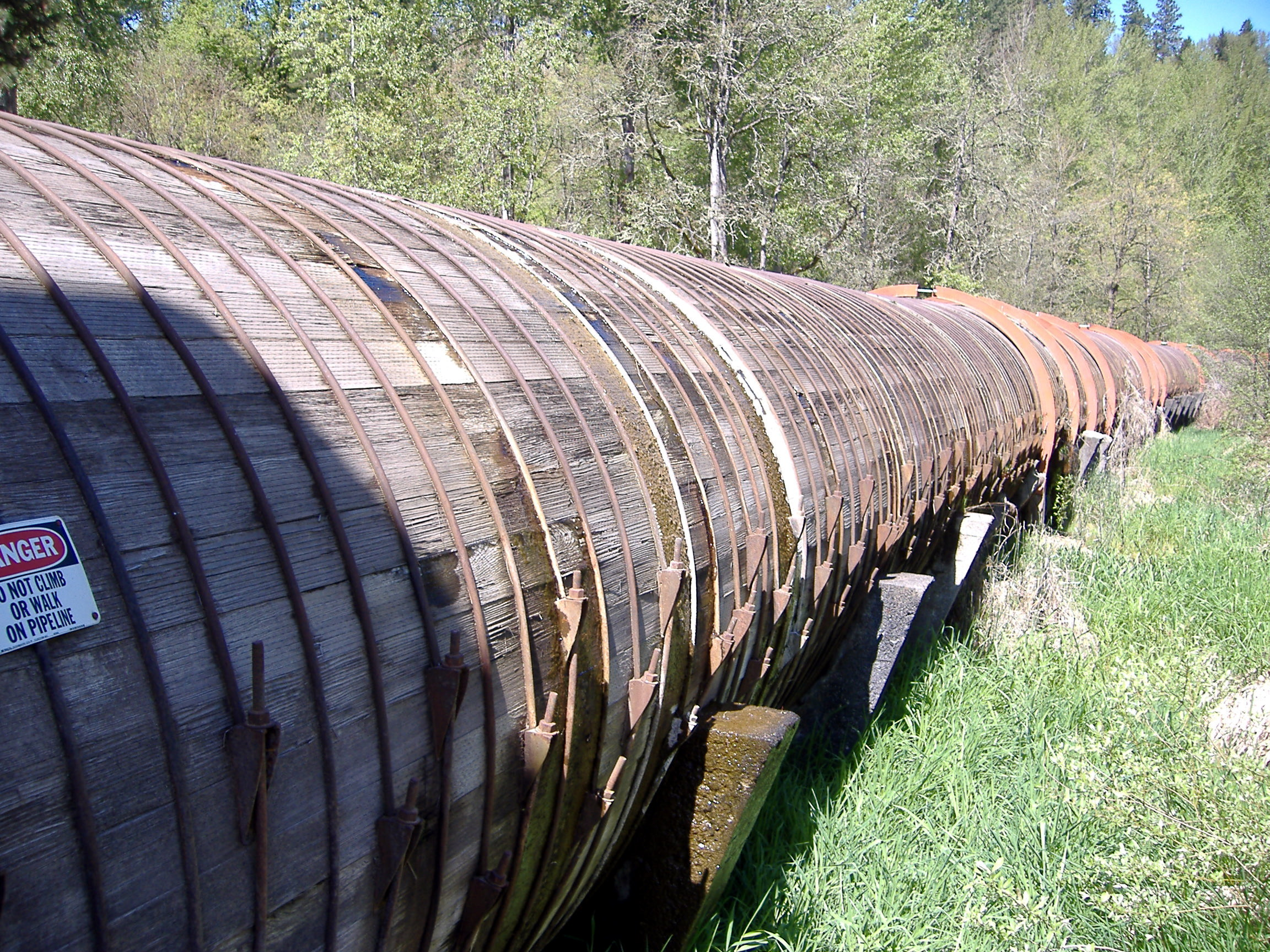
A wood stave pipeline for a hydropower application.

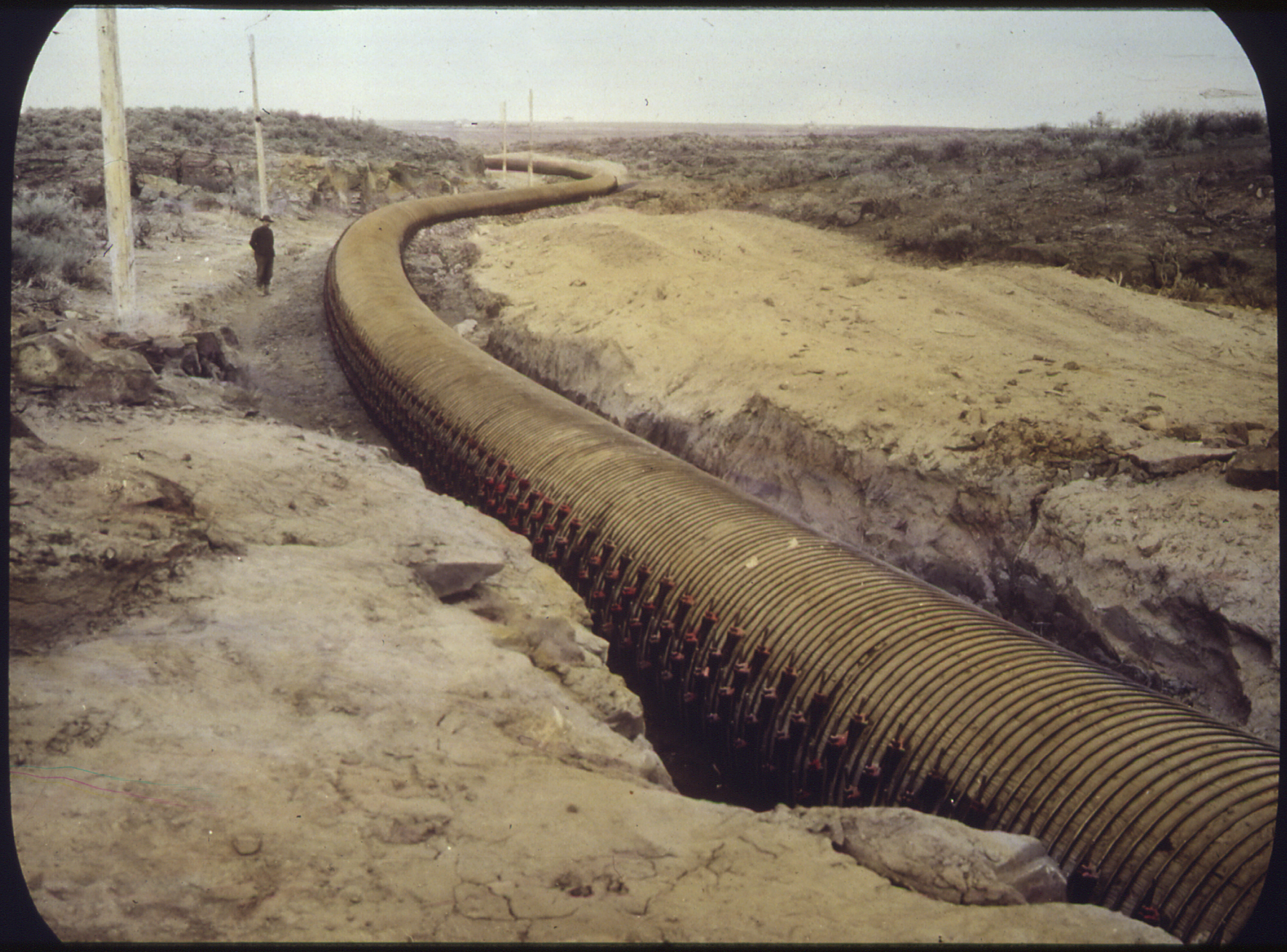
Wood stave pipeline part of the Yakima Project

A stave is a narrow length of wood with a slightly bevelled edge to form the sides of barrels, buckets, tanks, tubs, vats and pipelines, originally handmade by coopers. They have been used in the construction of large holding tanks and penstocks at hydro power developments. They are also used in the construction of certain musical instruments with rounded bodies or backs.

== See also ==
- Rubicon Hydroelectric Scheme, which has wood stave penstocks on operating power stations
- Lake Margaret Power Station, which had a wood stave penstock replaced in 2010
