= Jamieson River =

River in Victoria, Australia

Jamieson
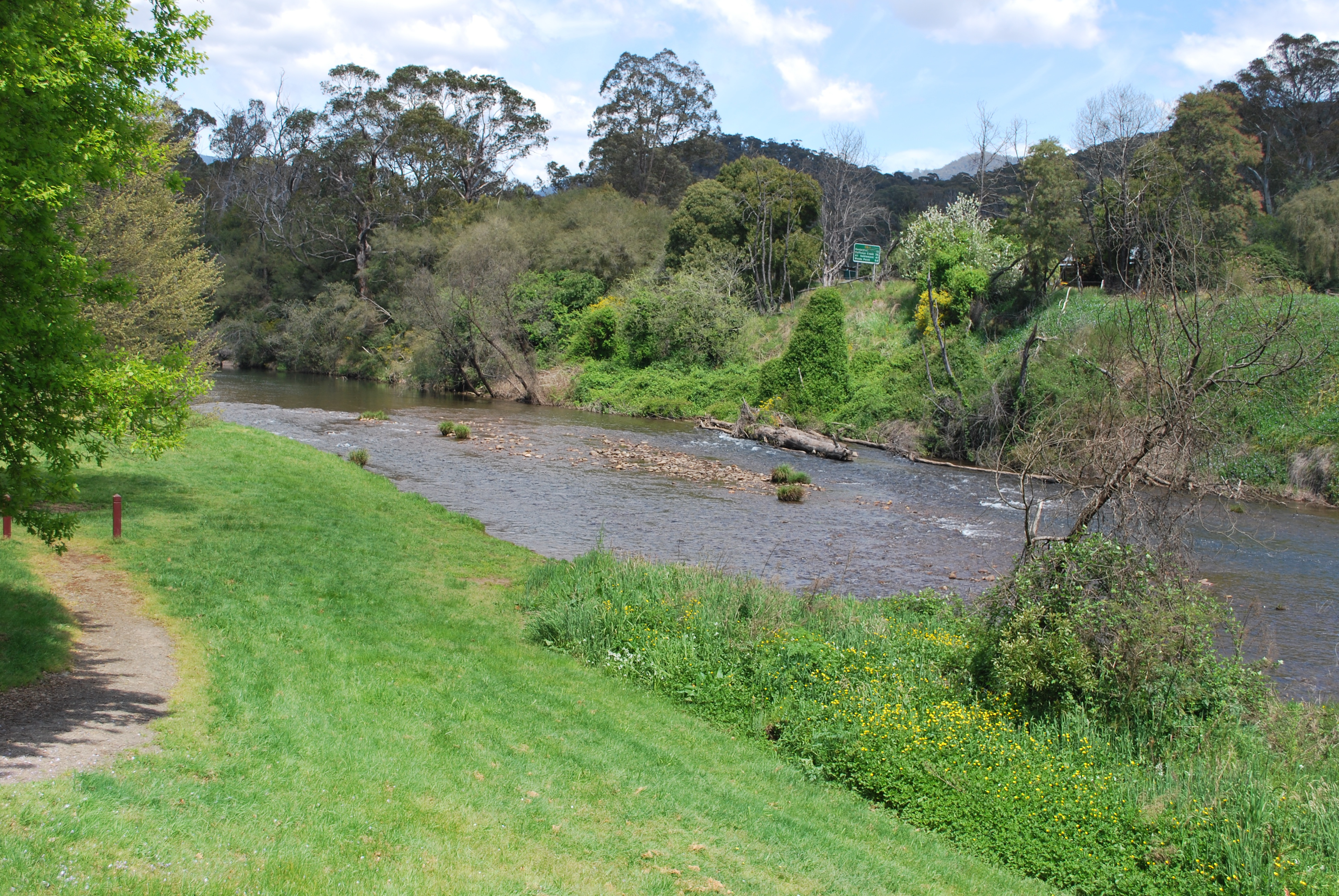
- The river at Jamieson, not far from its mouth

- Location of the mouth in Victoria

Location
- Country: Australia
- State: Victoria
- Region: Victorian Alps, North Central

Physical characteristics
- Source: Alpine National Park
  - location: Jamieson River/Deep Creek Nature Conservation Reserve, below Mount Buller
  - coordinates: 37°20′33″S 146°22′20″E
- Mouth: confluence with the Goulburn River
  - location: Jamieson
  - coordinates: 37°17′54″S 146°08′03″E
- Length: 46 km (29 mi)

Basin features
- River system: Goulburn–Broken catchment, Murray–Darling basin
- Tributaries
  - left: Jamieson River South, Hartford Creek, Halfway Creek, Kevington Creek, Nancy Creek
  - right: Jamieson River North, Mitchell Creek, Devonian Creek
- Bridges: Brewery Bridge; Foot's Bridge

The Jamieson River is a perennial river that is part of the Goulburn–Broken catchment in the Murray–Darling basin, located within the north-eastern region of Victoria, Australia.

The river rises in the Alpine National Park, below Mount Buller and flows generally west towards the town of Jamieson where it forms confluence with the Goulburn River. Its tributaries are Jamieson River north branch and Jamieson River south branch and several other minor creeks.

== Recreation ==
The Jamieson has the blend of successive pools and runs, gravel beds, and varying water level and current. Easy accessibility in the lower course, combined with the significant brown trout, rainbow trout, small redfin and river blackfish populations make the Jamieson a great fishing river.

== Gallery ==
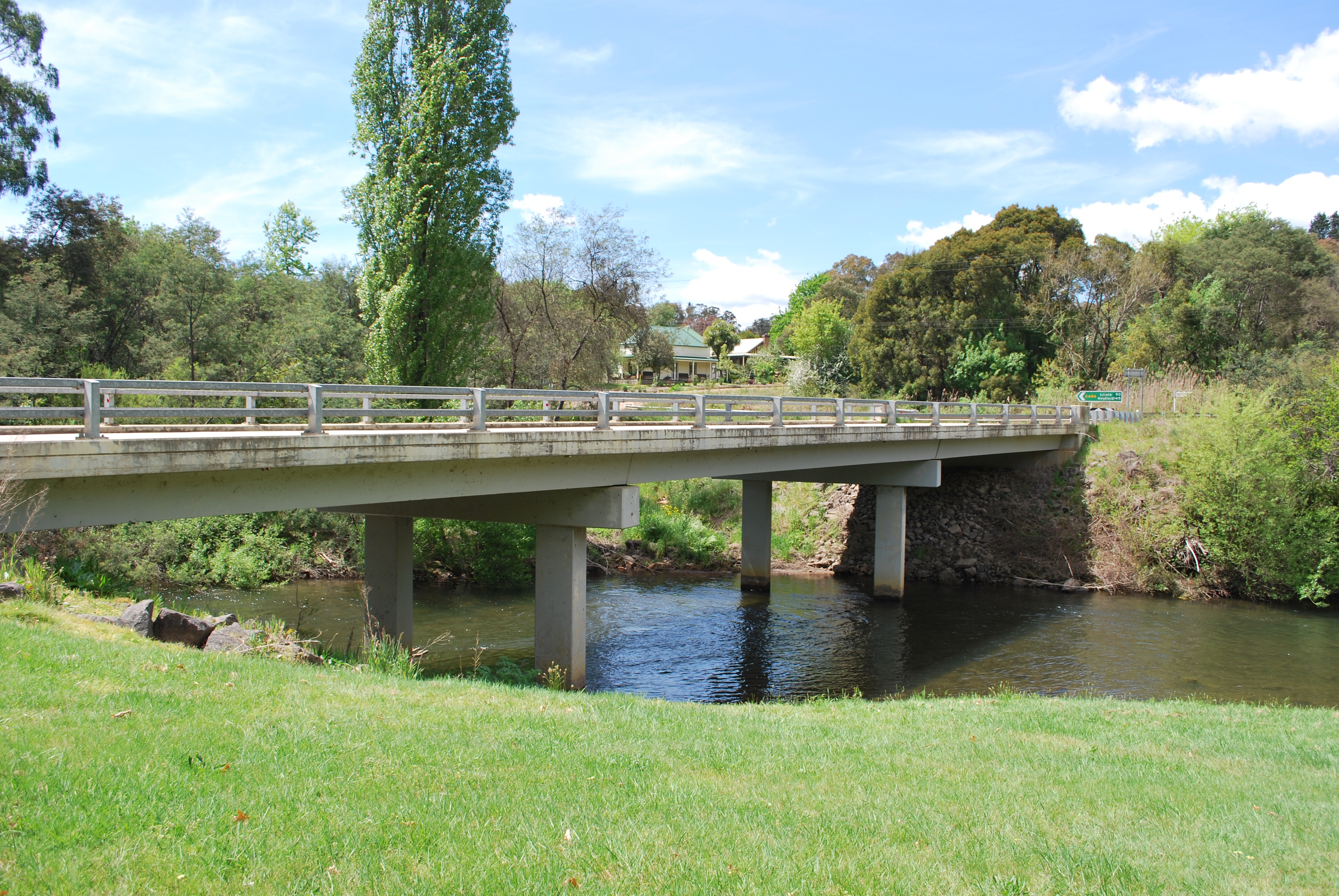
Brewery Bridge, at Jamieson

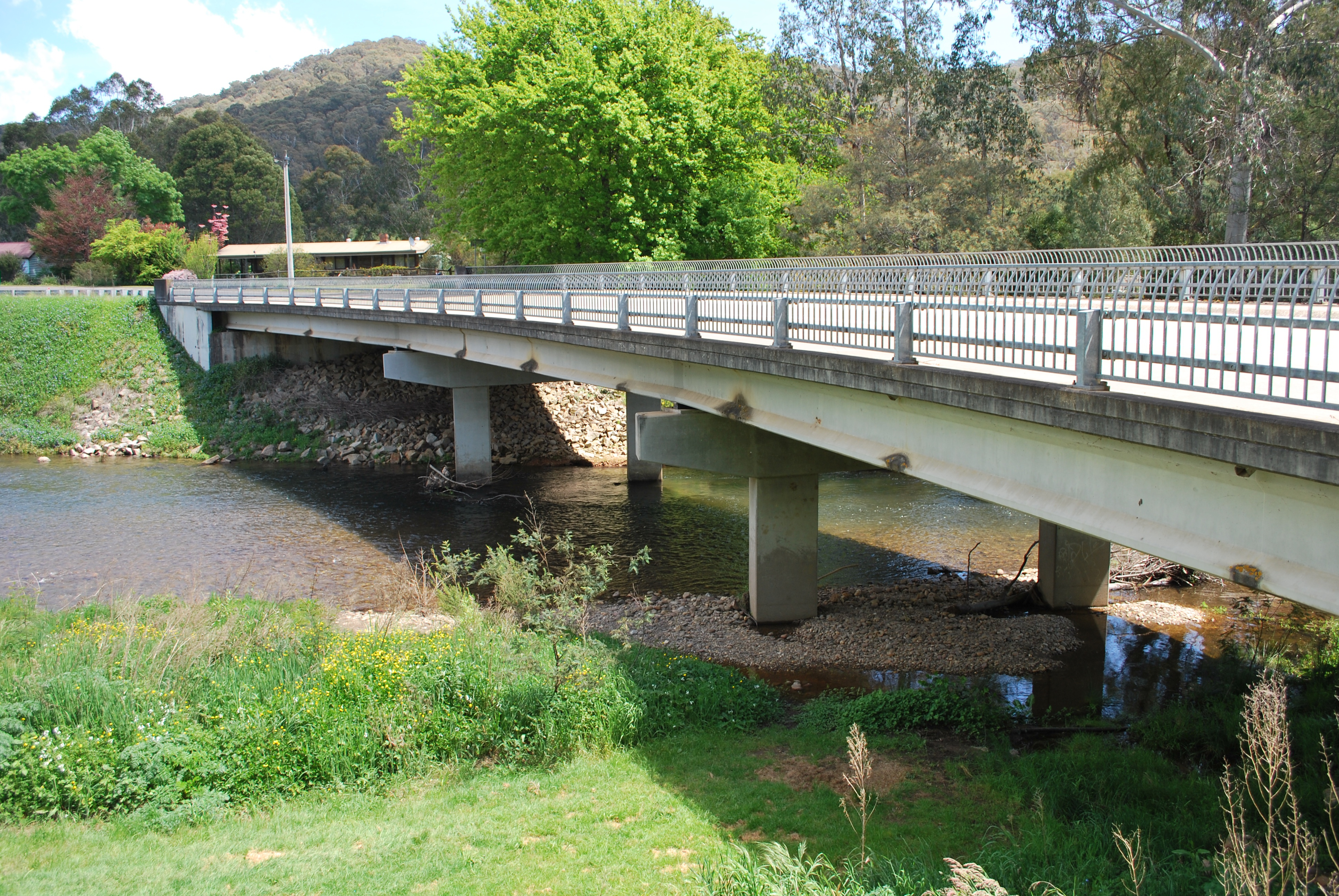
Foot's Bridge, at Jamieson

== See also ==
- List of rivers in Australia § Victoria
