= Lower Goulburn National Park =

- IUCN category II (national park)
- Location within Victoria
- Location: Victoria
- Nearest city: Shepparton
- Coordinates: 36°10′54″S 145°7′13″E
- Area: 93.1 km^{2} (35.9 sq mi)
- Established: June 2010
- Governing body: Parks Victoria
- Website: Official website

The Lower Goulburn National Park is a national park located in the Goulburn Valley district of Victoria, Australia. The 9,310-hectare (23,000-acre) linear national park protects the lower Goulburn River from Shepparton to its river mouth near Echuca where it forms confluence with the Murray River.

The park is renowned for its Eucalyptus camaldulensis (river red gums) that line much of the course of the river and the national park.

== See also ==
- Protected areas of Victoria
- List of national parks of Australia
