= Black River (Victoria) =

River in Victoria, Australia

- Location of the Black River mouth in Victoria

Location
- Country: Australia
- State: Victoria
- Region: South Eastern Highlands bioregion (IBRA), Northern Country/North Central
- Local government area: Mansfield

Physical characteristics
- Source: Yarra Ranges, Great Dividing Range
  - location: below Mount Singleton
  - coordinates: 37°33′53.7″S 146°25′20.3″E
  - elevation: 688 m (2,257 ft)
- Mouth: confluence with the Goulburn River
  - location: Burnt Camp
  - coordinates: 37°30′56.1″S 146°18′17.7″E
  - elevation: 479 m (1,572 ft)
- Length: 16 km (9.9 mi)

Basin features
- River system: Goulburn Broken catchment, Murray-Darling basin
- Tributaries
  - right: Lazarini Creek
- National park: Yarra Ranges National Park

The Black River, an inland perennial river of the Goulburn Broken catchment, part of the Murray-Darling basin, is located in the lower South Eastern Highlands bioregion and Northern Country/North Central regions of the Australian state of Victoria. The headwaters of the Black River rise on the northern slopes of the Yarra Ranges and descend to flow into the Goulburn River within the Yarra Ranges National Park.

== Location and features ==
The Black River rises in remote state forestry country on the northern slopes of the Yarra Ranges, part of the Great Dividing Range, below Mount Singleton. The river flows generally north, through rugged national park and state forests as the river descends, joined by one minor tributary, before reaching its confluence with the Goulburn River near Burnt Camp. The river descends 210 metres (690 ft) over its 16-kilometre (9.9 mi) course.

== See also ==
- List of rivers of Australia § Victoria
