= Rubicon River (Victoria) =

Rubicon
- Location of the Rubicon River mouth in Victoria
- Etymology: Latin: rubico

Location
- Country: Australia
- State: Victoria
- Region: South Eastern Highlands bioregion (IBRA), Northern Country/North Central
- Local government area: Murrindindi
- Towns: Rubicon

Physical characteristics
- Source: Victorian Alps, Great Dividing Range
  - location: below Blue Range
  - coordinates: 37°27′16″S 145°51′38″E
  - elevation: 891 m (2,923 ft)
- Mouth: confluence with the Goulburn River
  - location: west of Thornton
  - coordinates: 37°14′35″S 145°45′0″E
  - elevation: 198 m (650 ft)
- Length: 26 km (16 mi)

Basin features
- River system: Goulburn Broken catchment, Murray-Darling basin
- Tributaries
  - right: Quartz Creek (Victoria), Royston River

The Rubicon River, an inland perennial river of the Goulburn Broken catchment, part of the Murray-Darling basin, is located in the lower South Eastern Highlands bioregion and Northern Country/North Central regions of the Australian state of Victoria. The headwaters of the Rubicon River rise on the western slopes of the Victorian Alps and descend to flow into the Goulburn River.

== Location and features ==
The Rubicon River rises from the Great Dividing Range below the Blue Range east of Buxton, and flows northwest, fuelled by runoff from the Blue and Cerberean Ranges, joined by the Royston River and one minor tributary, before reaching its confluence with the Goulburn River, west of the town of Thornton. The river descends 693 metres (2,274 ft) over its 26-kilometre (16 mi) course.

The Rubicon Hydroelectric Scheme, a small run-of-the-river hydroelectric scheme, is located at the mouth of the Royston River. The Rubicon River is impounded by a 64-metre (210 ft) concrete arch dam diverts water into the 3.4-kilometre (2.1 mi) Rubicon aqueduct to the site of the Royston Power Station, where it collects water diverted from the Royston River. Water then travels a further 5.4 kilometres (3.4 mi) to the Rubicon Power Station forebay. The Rubicon Power Station has two 4.6-megawatt (6,200 hp) horizontal single-jet Pelton wheel generators. Further power stations are located at the 2.7-megawatt (3,600 hp) Lower Rubicon Power Station, some 2.3 kilometres (1.4 mi) down-river and at the 0.3-megawatt (400 hp) Rubicon Falls Power Station. Established in 1924, the Scheme is on the Victorian Heritage Register and the Register of the National Estate.

== Etymology ==
The river was at first probably called Rubicon Creek. The naming of the river first appeared on Thomas Ham's Map of Australia Felix in 1847, and was listed by Wells in 1848. The name of the river is derived from the Latin word rubico, a reddish river in central Italy, perhaps the modern Fiumicino or Pisciatello, at the border of Cisalpine Gaul and Italy.

== See also ==
- List of rivers of Australia § Victoria
