= Rubicon, Victoria =

Rubicon
- Town
- Coordinates: 37.3857001°S 145.845652°E
- Country: Australia
- State: Victoria
- Region: Hume
- LGA: Shire of Murrindindi
- Location: 11 km (6.8 mi) SW of Eildon; 96 km (60 mi) NE of Melbourne

Government
  - State electorate: Eildon
  - Federal division: Gippsland
- Elevation: 838 m (2,749 ft)

Population
  - Total: 44 (2021 census)
- Postcode: 3712
- Mean max temp: 15.2 °C (59.4 °F)
- Mean min temp: 6.9 °C (44.4 °F)
- Annual rainfall: 1,656.9 mm (65.23 in)
Localities around Rubicon
Thornton	Thornton	Eildon
Taggerty, Buxton	Rubicon	Eildon
Marysville	Marysville	Marysville

Rubicon is a locality in central Victoria, Australia, located in the Shire of Murrindindi. It is situated on the Rubicon River. In the 2021 census, Rubicon had a population of 44.

Much of the locality consists today of forested protected areas, variously including the Yarra Ranges National Park, Rubicon State Forest, Rubicon Valley Historic and Cultural Features Reserve, Marysville State Forest, Mount Bullfight Nature Conservation Reserve and Cathedral Range State Park.

It was once home to a significant timber industry, which was connected to the railhead at Alexandra by a network of tramways. It was severely damaged by the 1939 Black Friday bushfires and the local sawmill industry was phased out by 1953, though the forest continues to be used for logging to some extent. The Rubicon Hydro-Electric Scheme was established in 1928–29 to harness electricity from the Rubicon River and Royston River, and still functions today, though providing a far smaller proportion of the state's electricity than it once did. It is listed on the Victorian Heritage Register.

A small township, Tin Hut, servicing the timber and hydroelectric workers, was located at the corner of Royston Road and Herbs Road. It formerly had a state school (Rubicon Junction State School), post office and store. The 1947 post office and store building is the last surviving building from the settlement; it closed in June 1964 and is now privately owned. One of the three camping areas at Rubicon is located at the former townsite.

== Climate ==
Due to its latitude and elevation, Rubicon is frequently affected by snow and chilling rains throughout much of the year. Climate data are sourced from the old Rubicon S.E.C. Sawmill at an elevation of 838 metres (2,749 ft). Rubicon is one of the coldest localities by mean maximum temperature in mainland Australia, second only to Aberfeldy. On average there are 8.7 snowy days annually at the sawmill.

It is the second wettest locality in Victoria behind Bogong, possibly the wettest anywhere in mainland Australia's temperate zone. Cloud cover is extremely heavy in the winter months, as evident by the afternoon relative humidity readings. There is a pronounced autumnal lag, with March being notably warmer than December.

Climate data for Rubicon SEC (1943–1993); 838 m AMSL; 37.34° S, 145.85° E
Month	Jan	Feb	Mar	Apr	May	Jun	Jul	Aug	Sep	Oct	Nov	Dec	Year
Record high °C (°F)	37.5 (99.5)	36.7 (98.1)	32.9 (91.2)	27.5 (81.5)	20.5 (68.9)	16.8 (62.2)	16.7 (62.1)	18.5 (65.3)	23.9 (75.0)	26.7 (80.1)	32.9 (91.2)	32.9 (91.2)	37.5 (99.5)
Mean daily maximum °C (°F)	23.7 (74.7)	23.5 (74.3)	20.6 (69.1)	15.6 (60.1)	11.0 (51.8)	8.3 (46.9)	7.0 (44.6)	8.3 (46.9)	11.3 (52.3)	14.5 (58.1)	17.6 (63.7)	20.9 (69.6)	15.2 (59.3)
Mean daily minimum °C (°F)	11.7 (53.1)	12.1 (53.8)	10.6 (51.1)	7.6 (45.7)	5.3 (41.5)	3.2 (37.8)	2.1 (35.8)	2.6 (36.7)	3.9 (39.0)	6.0 (42.8)	7.7 (45.9)	9.8 (49.6)	6.9 (44.4)
Record low °C (°F)	2.4 (36.3)	2.8 (37.0)	0.1 (32.2)	0.0 (32.0)	−2.0 (28.4)	−2.6 (27.3)	−2.8 (27.0)	−5.6 (21.9)	−2.9 (26.8)	−1.8 (28.8)	−0.4 (31.3)	1.0 (33.8)	−5.6 (21.9)
Average precipitation mm (inches)	70.5 (2.78)	53.9 (2.12)	73.6 (2.90)	115.1 (4.53)	181.4 (7.14)	187.6 (7.39)	228.4 (8.99)	227.3 (8.95)	164.4 (6.47)	149.8 (5.90)	112.7 (4.44)	89.1 (3.51)	1,656.9 (65.23)
Average precipitation days (≥ 0.2 mm)	7.4	6.8	8.5	10.7	15.7	16.8	19.9	20.2	16.0	15.6	12.9	10.3	160.8
Average afternoon relative humidity (%)	52	55	60	67	81	86	85	79	71	68	61	56	68
Source: Australian Bureau of Meteorology; Rubicon SEC
