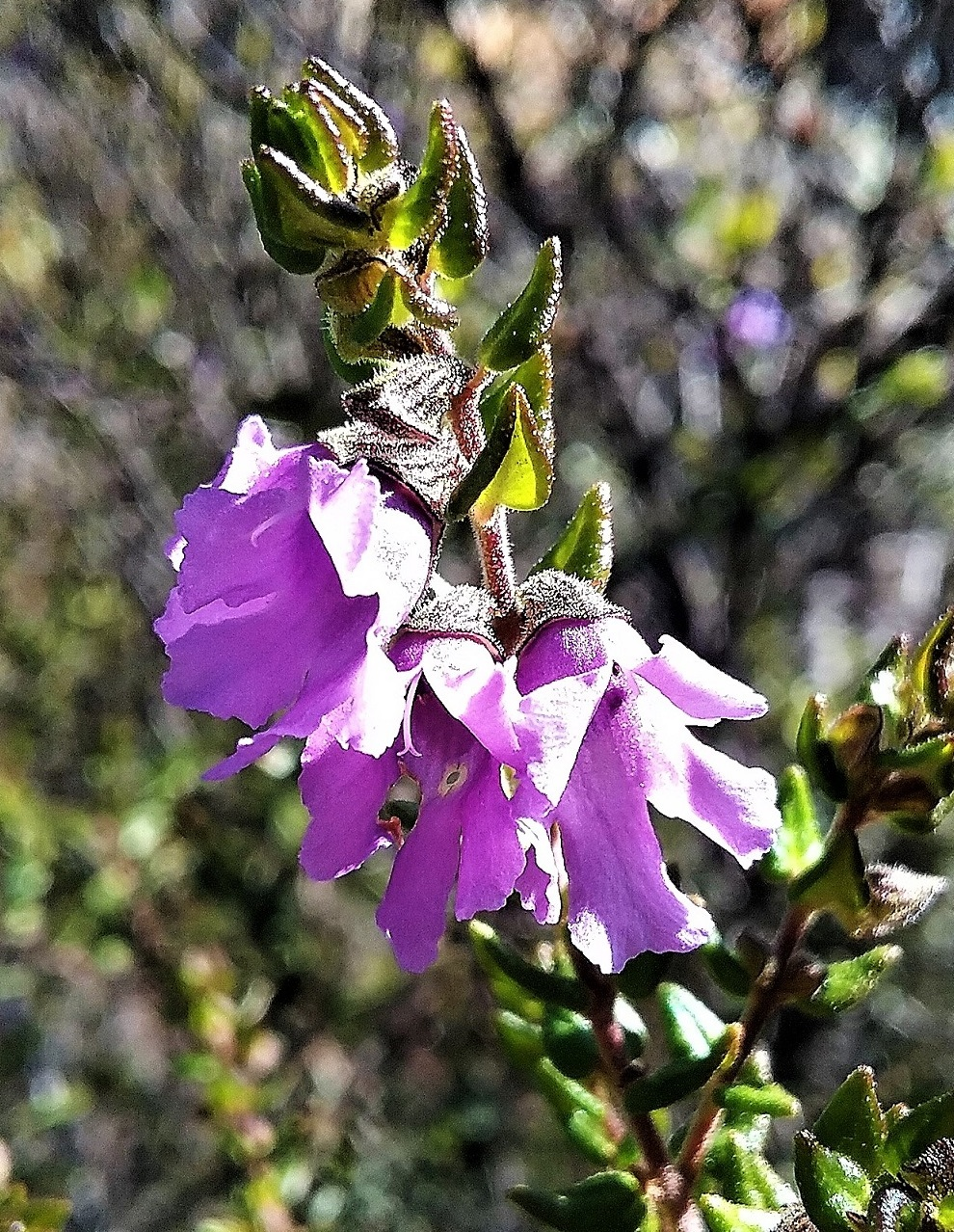
- Prostanthera rhombea near Lithgow

Scientific classification
- Kingdom: Plantae
- Clade: Tracheophytes
- Clade: Angiosperms
- Clade: Eudicots
- Clade: Asterids
- Order: Lamiales
- Family: Lamiaceae
- Genus: Prostanthera
- Species: P. rhombea

Binomial name
- Prostanthera rhombea R.Br.
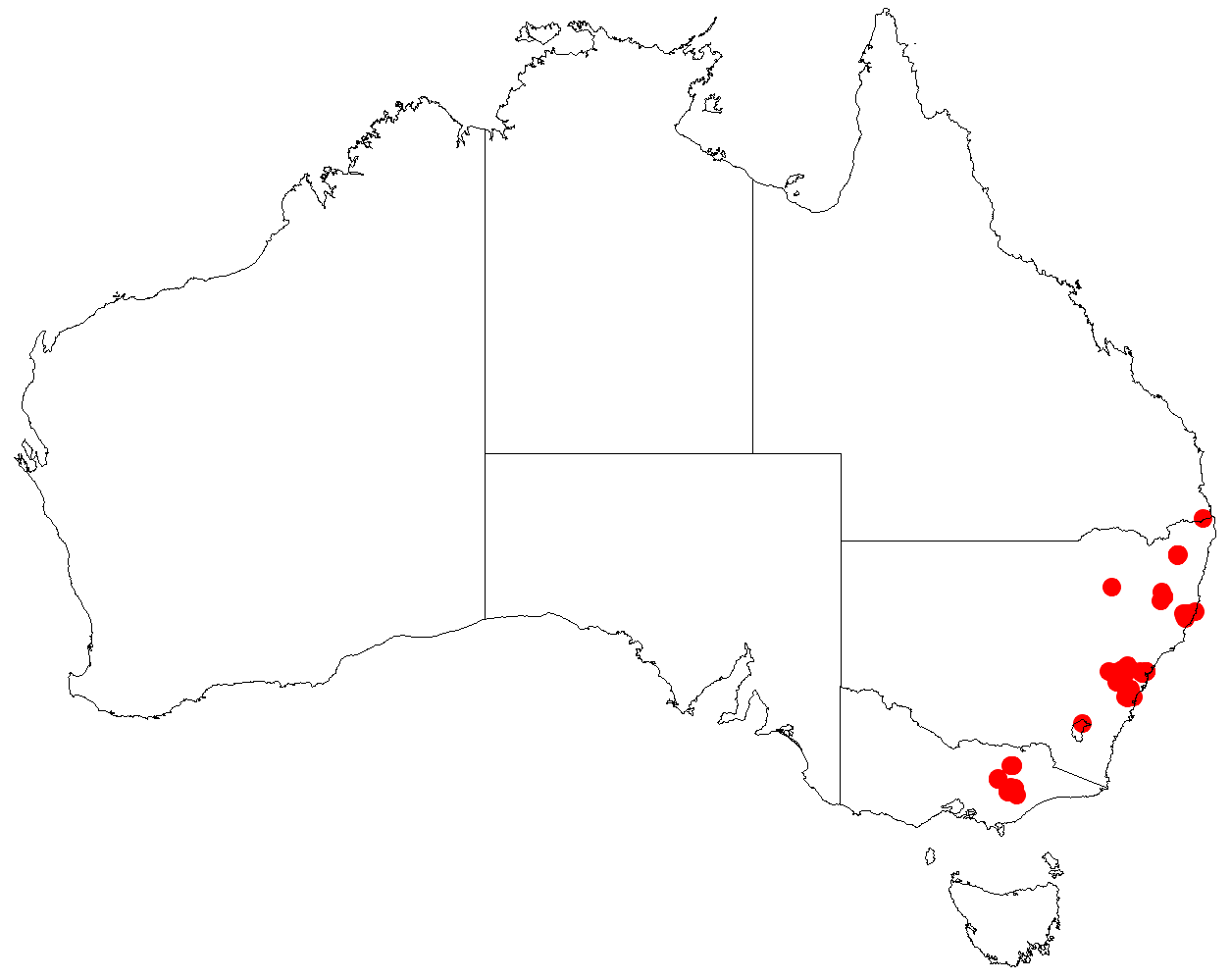
- Occurrence data from AVH

= Prostanthera rhombea =

Sparkling mint-bush

Species of flowering plant

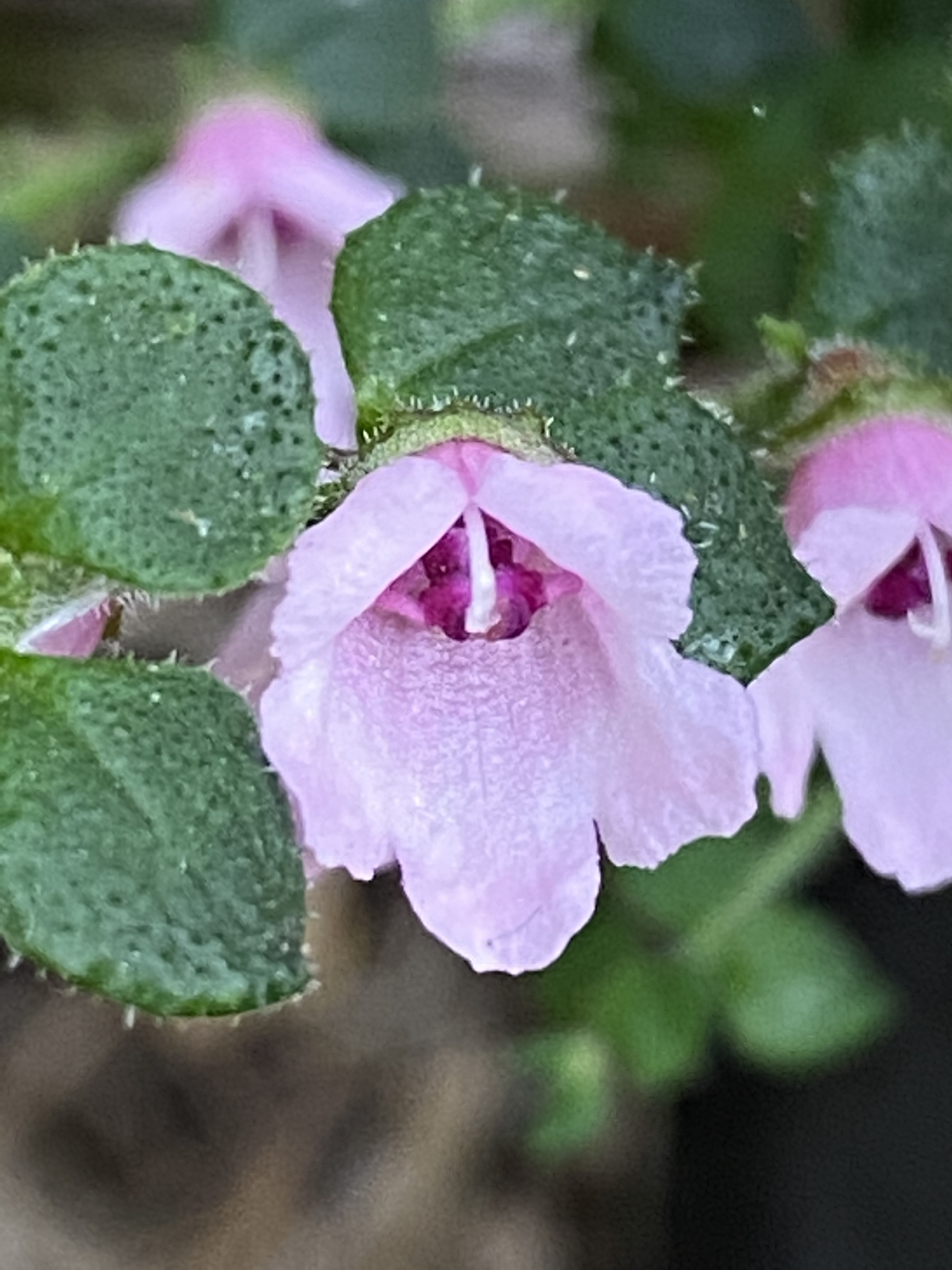
Pink form

Prostanthera rhombea, commonly known as sparkling mint-bush, is a plant in the family Lamiaceae and is endemic to disjunct areas of south-eastern Australia. It is an openly-branched shrub with strongly aromatic branches, circular to heart-shaped leaves and mauve or bluish flowers.

== Description ==
Prostanthera rhombea is an openly-branched shrub that typically grows to a height of 0.5–2 m (1 ft 8 in – 6 ft 7 in) and has strongly aromatic branches that are covered with glandular hairs. The leaves are more or less round to broadly heart-shaped with the edges rolled downwards, 2–6 mm (0.079–0.236 in) long and 2–5.5 mm (0.079–0.217 in) wide on a petiole 0.3–1 mm (0.012–0.039 in) long, the leaves with both glandular hairs and sessile glands. The flowers are arranged singly in leaf axils near the ends of branchlets with bracteoles 1.5–2 mm (0.059–0.079 in) long at the base. The sepals are 4–5 mm (0.16–0.20 in) long, forming a tube 1.4–2 mm (0.055–0.079 in) long with two lobes, the upper lobe about 2 mm (0.079 in) long. The petals are 7–8 mm (0.28–0.31 in) long and mauve or bluish, often with white tips.

== Taxonomy ==
Prostanthera rhombea was first formally described in 1810 by Robert Brown in his treatise Prodromus Florae Novae Hollandiae et Insulae Van Diemen.

== Distribution and habitat ==
Sparkling mint-bush grows in rainforest and forest, often in gullies or near streams, mainly from Port Macquarie to the Nepean River in New South Wales and in low heath and woodland in rocky places in three isolated areas in Victoria - near Licola, Mount Timbertop and Mount Buffalo.
