= Tunnel Bend diversion tunnel, Howqua River =

Coordinates: 37°11′8″S 146°22′26″E

The Tunnel Bend diversion tunnel is located at Tunnel Bend, near Sheepyard Flat, on the Howqua River, approximately 30 km south-east of Mansfield, Victoria, Australia.

The tunnel is approximately 100 metres long. It was built in 1884 (completed on 29 May 1884), during the Victorian gold rush, as part of the 4 km headrace from the Howqua River to a 63-foot waterwheel at the Howqua United gold treatment works below Sheepyard Flat.

The site is part of the Howqua Hills Historic Area and is registered in the Victorian Heritage Register.

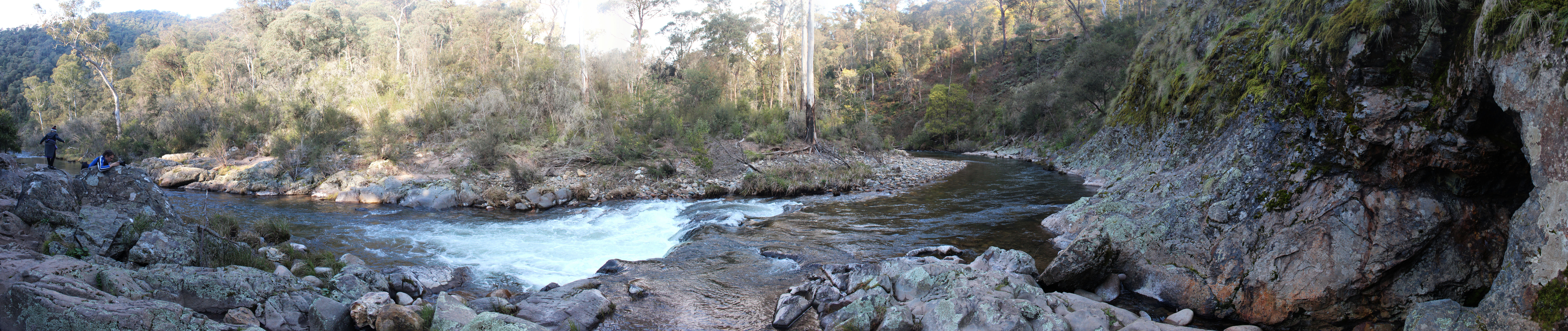
Howqua River at Tunnel Bend. Photo by Takver
