= Seven Creeks =

Coordinates: 36°29′S 145°25′E

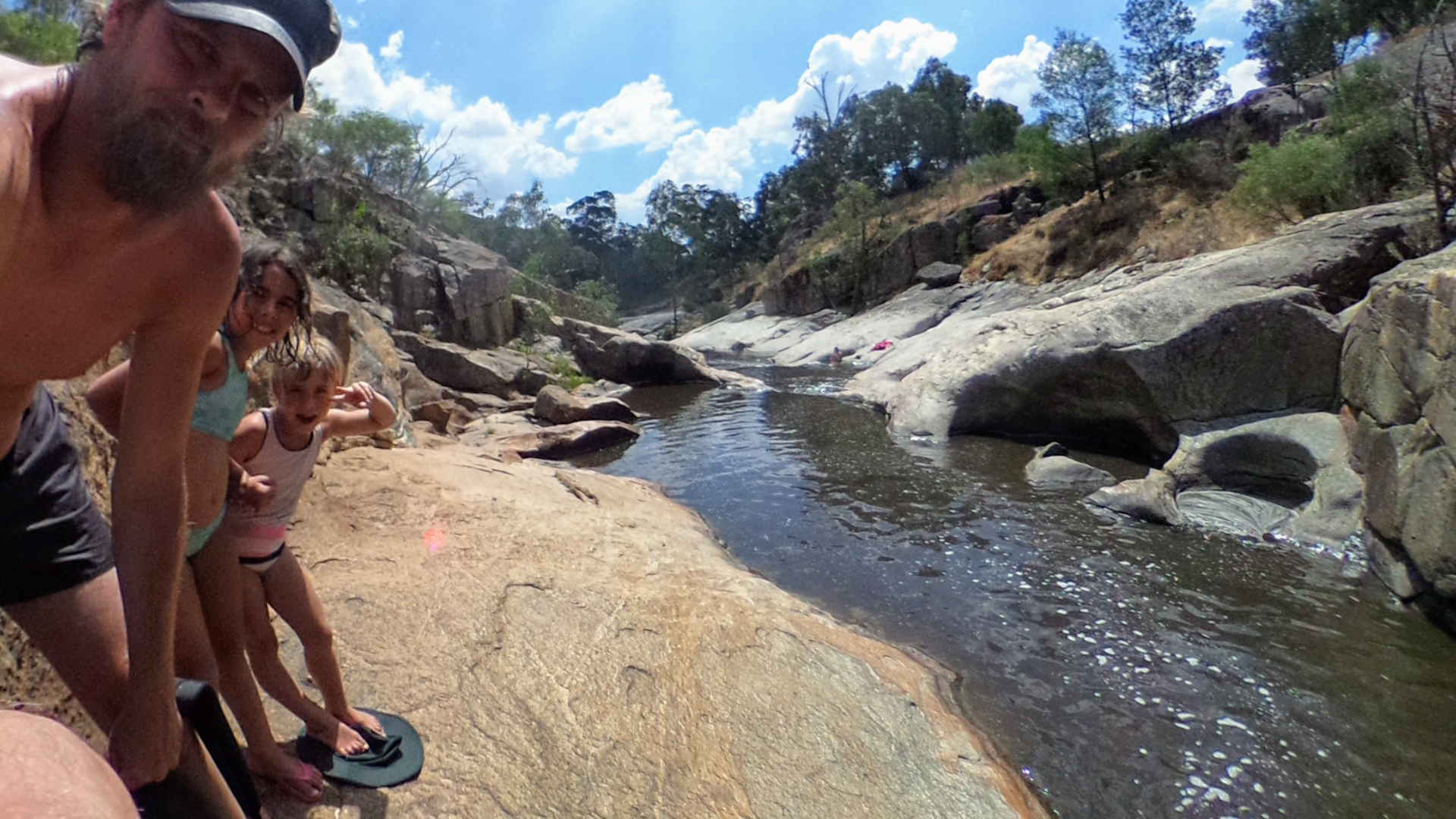
Swimmers at Gooram Falls Reserve on Seven Creeks, Victoria

Seven Creeks is a creek in Victoria, Australia that is a part of the Murray-Darling Basin. The confluence of this river is located in Kialla, flowing into the Goulburn River. The creek passes through Euroa.

In 1836 during his Australia Felix expedition, Major Mitchell camped on the banks of Seven Creeks at Euroa.

== See also ==
- Goulburn River
