= Mount Terrible (Victoria) =

Mountain in Victoria, Australia

Mount Terrible (Warrambat)
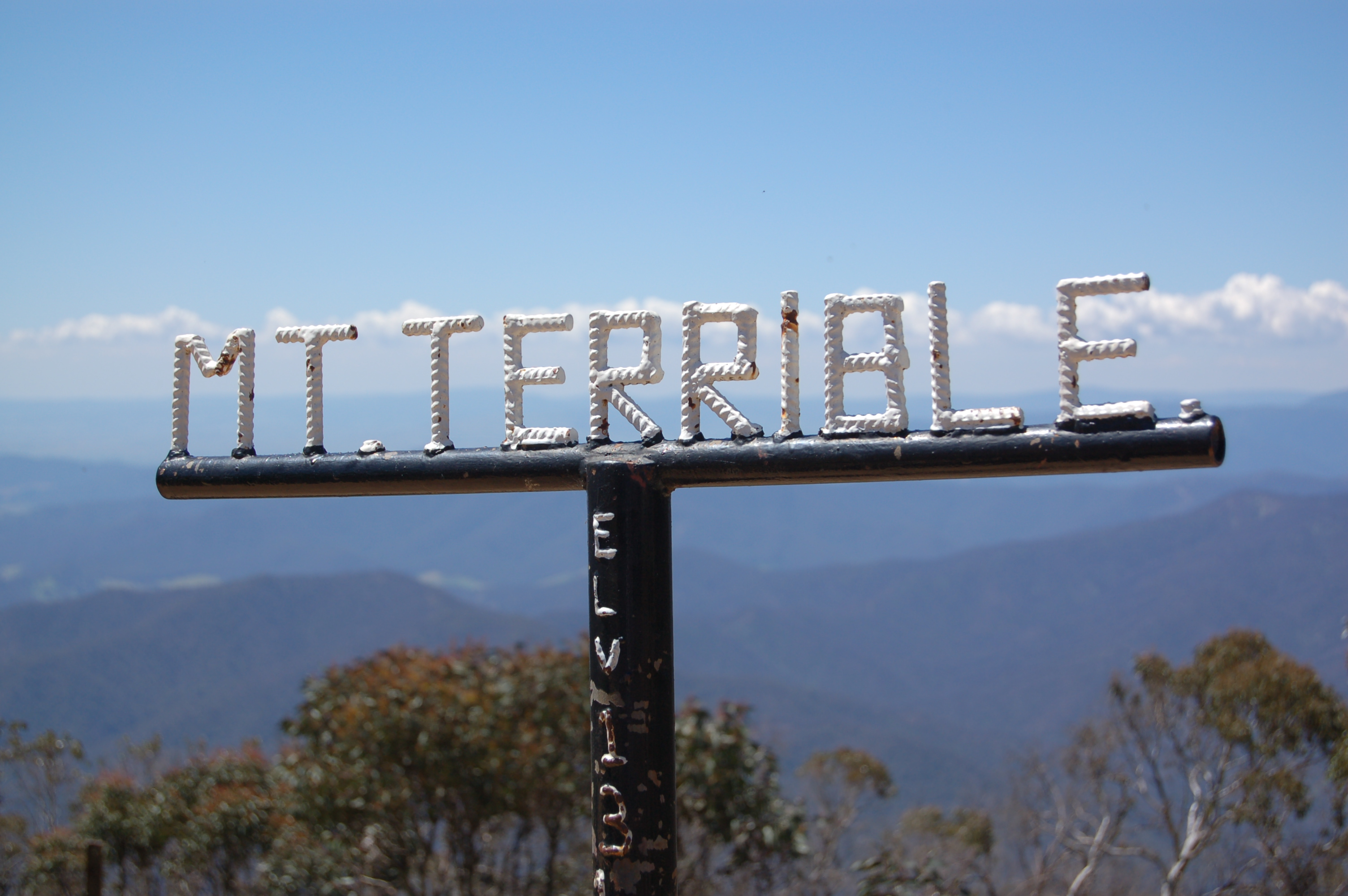
- The sign at the summit

Highest point
- Elevation: 1,325 metres (4,347 ft) AHD
- Coordinates: 37°23′44″S 146°8′25″E

Geography
- Location within Shire of Mansfield
- Location: Victoria, Australia
- Parent range: Great Dividing Range

Mount Terrible (Taungurung: Warrambat) is a mountain within the Great Dividing Range, located to the south-west of Kevington in Victoria, Australia. The mountain is located within the 100-hectare (250-acre) Mount Terrible Natural Features and Scenic Reserve.

== Location and features ==
Its peak is 1,325 metres (4,347 ft) AHD and affords excellent views.

A fire lookout tower was installed in 1962 to replace the Jamieson Lookout. The hut next to the lookout tower burnt down during the night of 8–9 December 2012. Its reconstruction was approved in 2016.

The tower is a steel structure measuring 22 metres (72 ft) high and has a cabin on top. The tower is utilised for communications by Telstra, Ambulance Victoria, Department of Sustainability and Environment, Victorian State Emergency Service, LSE Technology and the Upper Goulburn Repeater Association (UHF CB).

Access to the summit is via a 4 wheel drive track. The track is rocky, and may be covered by snow in the winter.

== See also ==
- Alpine National Park
- List of mountains in Australia § Victoria
