= Howqua River =

River in Victoria, Australia

Howqua
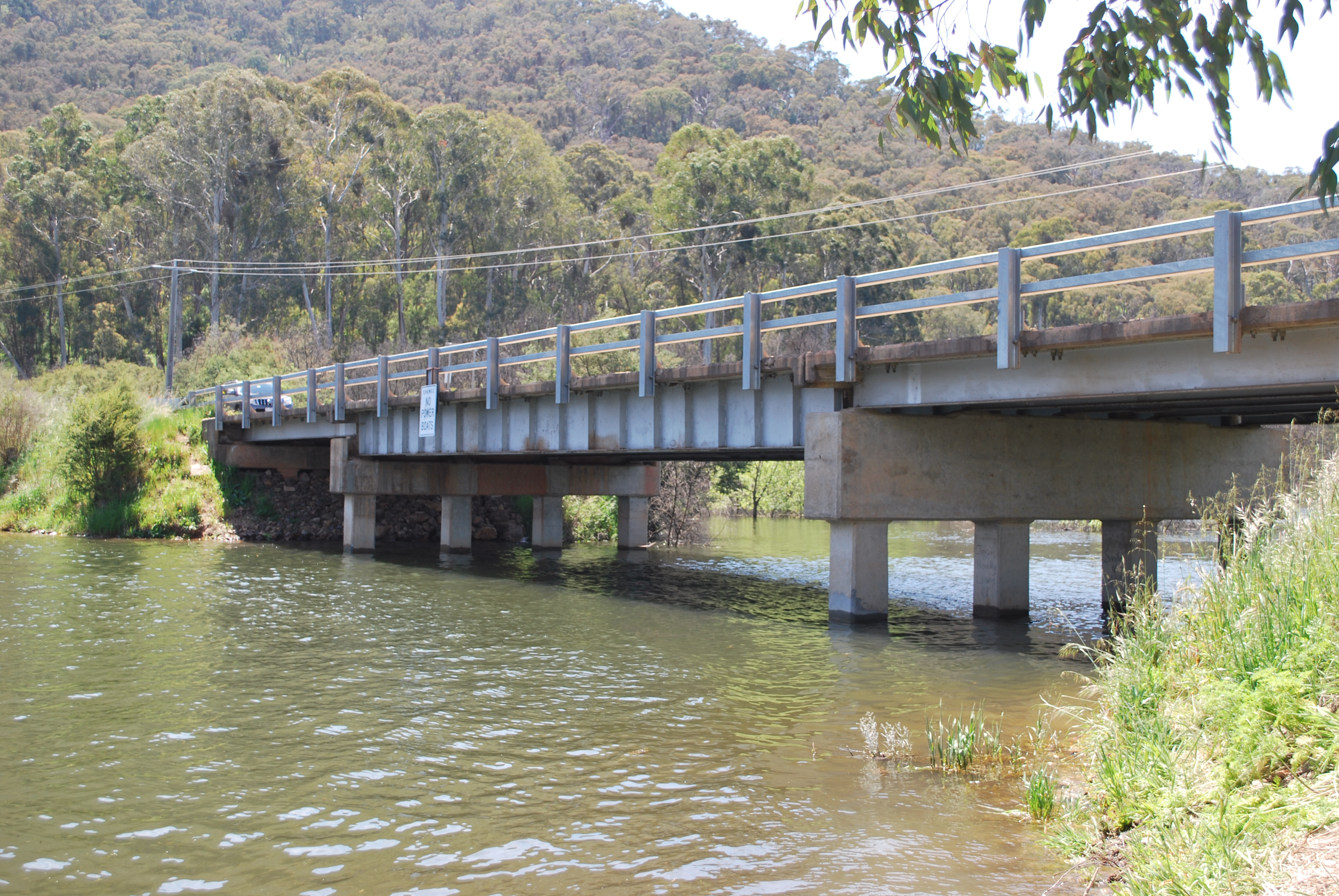
- The Howqua River, upstream of the Howqua Inlet and the settlement of Howqua, in 2012

- Location of the Howqua River mouth in Victoria
- Etymology: multiple possible derivations
- Native name: Pyerlite (Daungwurrung)

Location
- Country: Australia
- State: Victoria
- Region: Alpine bioregion (IBRA), Victorian Alps
- Local government area: Shire of Mansfield

Physical characteristics
- Source: Victorian Alps, Great Dividing Range
  - location: below Mount Howitt
  - coordinates: 37°10′43″S 146°37′46″E
  - elevation: 1,680 m (5,510 ft)
- Mouth: confluence with the Goulburn River
  - location: Lake Eildon
  - coordinates: 37°13′48″S 146°5′54″E
  - elevation: 265 m (869 ft)
- Length: 65.6 km (40.8 mi)
- Discharge
  - location: lake

Basin features
- River system: Goulburn Broken catchment, Murray-Darling basin
- Tributaries
  - left: Lickhole Creek
  - right: Black Dog Creek, Little Buller Creek, Stockyard Creek, Dungeon Gully Creek
- National park: Alpine National Park

The Howqua River, a minor inland perennial river of the Goulburn Broken catchment, part of the Murray-Darling basin, is located in the Alpine region of the Australian state of Victoria. The headwaters of the Howqua River rise below Mount Howitt in the western slopes of the Victorian Alps, and descend to flow into the Goulburn River within Lake Eildon.

== Location and features ==
The river rises below Mount Howitt, on the western slopes of the Victorian Alps, within the Alpine National Park, in the Shire of Mansfield. The river flows generally west, joined by five minor tributaries, before reaching its confluence with the Goulburn River within Lake Eildon, which was created by the construction of the Eildon Dam. The river descends 1,410 metres (4,630 ft) over its 66-kilometre (41 mi) course.

== Cultural references ==
The Howqua valley was seasonally occupied by the Taungurung people with the valley being a major route for trade or war between tribes in the area. The Howqua River valley contains a number of archaeological sites of significance including at least two quarry sites for greenstone, an exceptionally hard rock used for stone axes, spears and other cutting tools which the Taungurung traded with other tribes.

The character of Billy Slim in Nevil Shute's 1952 novel The Far Country was based on Fred Fry, a notable fly fisherman, who constructed several huts along the Howqua River and eked out a quiet existence in the river valley.

The Howqua River was one of just thirteen locations worldwide featured on the fly fishing documentary television series A River Somewhere.

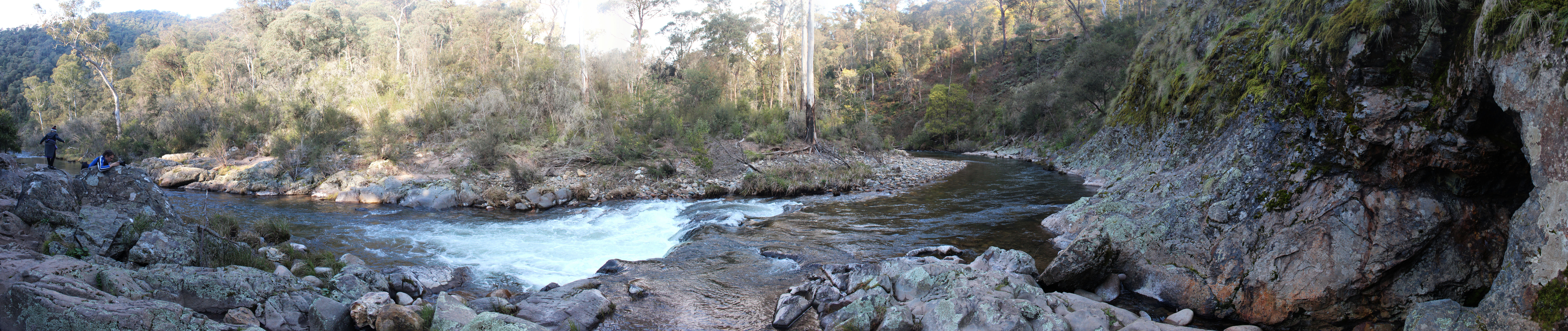
Howqua River at Tunnel Bend

== Etymology ==
In the Aboriginal Woiwurrung and Taungurung languages, the river is named Pyerlite, with no clearly defined meaning.

There are four possible origins of the river's current name:

- After John "Howka" Hunter (1820–68), a pastoralist
- A portmanteau name from Mount Howitt, where the river rises, and aqua
- After Howqua, the namesake of a popular brand of Chinese tea in the early nineteenth century
- After Akin Howqua (Ah Kin Wowqua), a Chinese surveyor and early resident of Melbourne

== See also ==
- List of rivers of Australia § Victoria
- Tunnel Bend diversion tunnel, Howqua River
