= Goulburn River =

River in Victoria, Australia

Goulburn
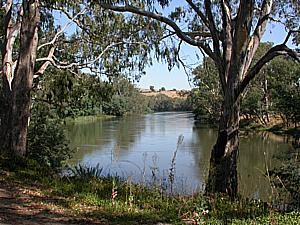
- Middle reaches of the Goulburn, near Seymour

- Course of the Goulburn River and the major irrigation channel diverted from the river in Victoria
- Etymology: In honour of Major Frederick Goulburn, the Colonial Secretary of New South Wales
- Native name: Warring (Woiwurrung); Koninner (Yorta Yorta); Gungupna (Yorta Yorta); Gaiyila, (Yorta Yorta); Omio (Woiwurrung); Bayyango (Woiwurrung)

Location
- Country: Australia
- State: Victoria
- Region: Alpine and Riverine bioregions (IBRA), Victorian Alps, Northern Country/North Central, Southern Riverina
- Local government areas: Mansfield, Murrindindi, Mitchell, Strathbogie, Greater Shepparton, Campaspe
- Towns and cities: Alexandra, Seymour, Nagambie, Murchison, Shepparton–Mooroopna, Echuca

Physical characteristics
- Source: Corn Hill, Victorian Alps, Great Dividing Range
  - location: near Woods Point
  - coordinates: 37°32′13″S 146°11′22″E
  - elevation: 1,210 m (3,970 ft)
- Mouth: confluence with the Murray River
  - location: near Echuca
  - coordinates: 36°6′11″S 144°49′47″E
  - elevation: 100 m (330 ft)
- Length: 654 km (406 mi)
- Basin size: 23,916 km^{2} (9,234 sq mi)
- Discharge
  - average: 84 m^{3}/s (3,000 cu ft/s)

Basin features
- River system: Goulburn Broken catchment, Murray-Darling basin
- Tributaries
  - left: Big River, Rubicon River, Acheron River, Yea River, Sunday Creek (Victoria)
  - right: Jamieson River, Howqua River, Delatite River, Seven Creeks, Broken River
- National parks: Lower Goulburn National Park

The Goulburn River, a major inland perennial river of the Goulburn Broken catchment, part of the Murray-Darling basin, is located in the Alpine, Northern Country/North Central, and Southern Riverina regions of the Australian state of Victoria. The headwaters of the Goulburn River rise in the western end of the Victorian Alps, below the peak of Corn Hill before descending to flow into the Murray River near Echuca, making it the longest river in Victoria at 654 kilometres (406 mi). The river is impounded by the Eildon Dam to create Lake Eildon, the Eildon Pondage, the Goulburn Weir and Waranga Basin.

== Location and features ==
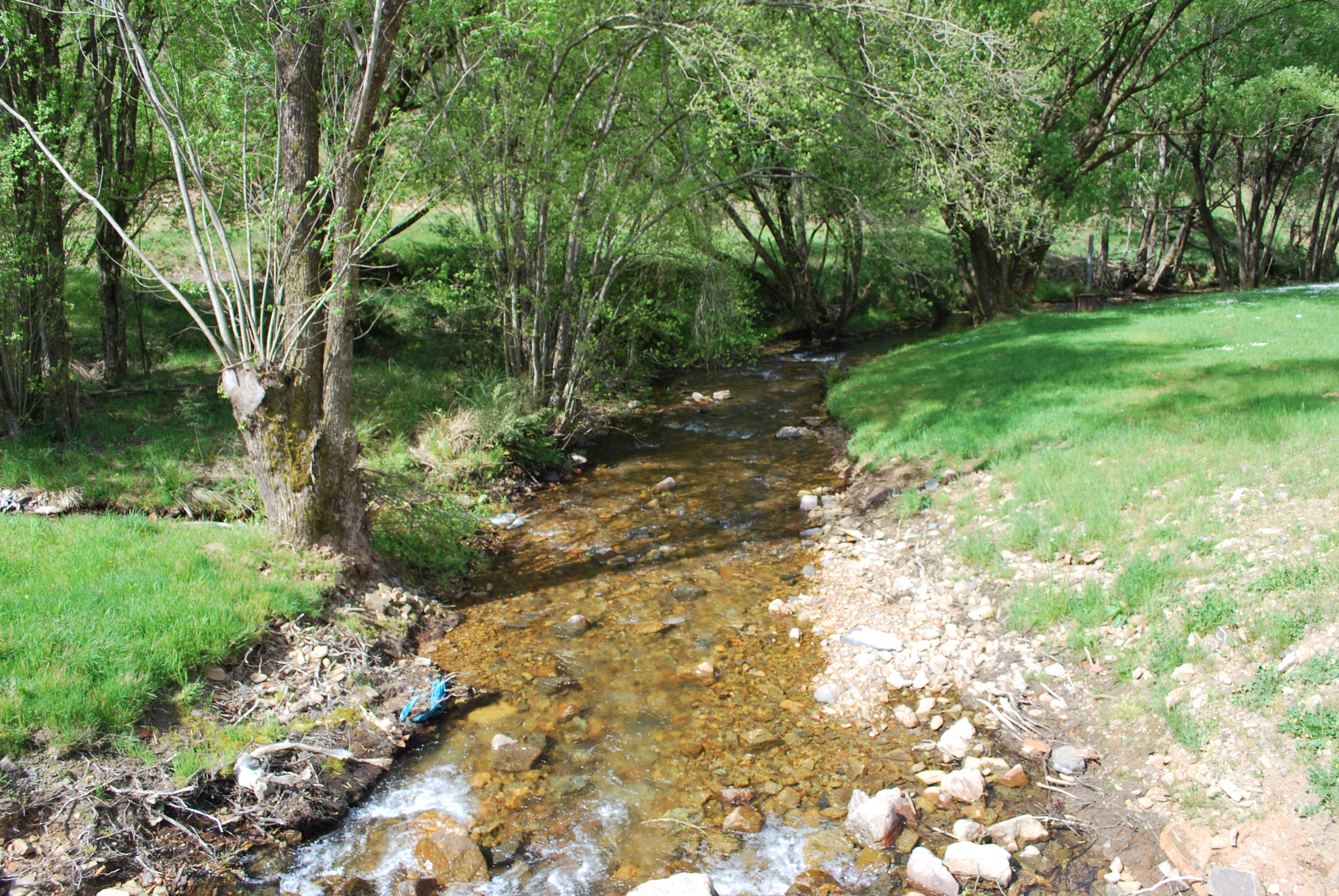
Goulburn River near its source at Woods Point, 2012

The river rises below Corn Hill on the southwestern slopes of the Victorian Alps, south of Eildon near the town of Woods Point in the Shire of Mansfield. The river flows generally north, then west, then north, then west passing through or adjacent to the regional cities and towns of Alexandra, Seymour, Nagambie, Murchison, Arcadia Downs, Shepparton–Mooroopna before reaching its confluence with the Murray River near Echuca. The Goulburn has 41 tributaries including the Black, Jamieson, Howqua, Delatite, Big, Rubicon, Acheron, Yea, and Broken rivers and the Seven Creeks. The river descends 1,100 metres (3,600 ft) over its 654-kilometre (406 mi) course.

In addition to being the longest river in Victoria, the Goulburn also has the highest discharge and the highest annual flow of any river in Victoria. The area surrounding the river is very productive as a result of irrigated agriculture. The Goulburn (Along with the Upper Murray and Murrumbidgee rivers) accounts for 45% of the Murray-Darling Basin's total runoff. By contrast, the Darling basin contributes just 31.7% of the basin's total runoff.

=== River quality ===
Much of the flow is extracted, and the river is very heavily regulated, which has strongly affected the river's ecosystem. With recent years being some of the driest on record in the basin, there has been even further stress on the river's ecosystem. Because of all this there has been much controversy over the construction of the North–South Pipeline, which will pipe 70 gigalitres (15×10^{9} imp gal; 18×10^{9} US gal) of water annually to Melbourne's water supply. There are arguments that all the water piped to Melbourne will be saved water, by the upgrade of the irrigation infrastructure in the Goulburn river basin all a part of a food bowl modernisation project. In June 2008 the Murray-Darling Basin Commission released a report on the condition of the Murray-Darling basin, with the Goulburn and Murrumbidgee rivers both rated in a very poor condition in the Murray-Darling basin with fish stocks in both rivers were also rated as extremely poor.

== Recreation ==
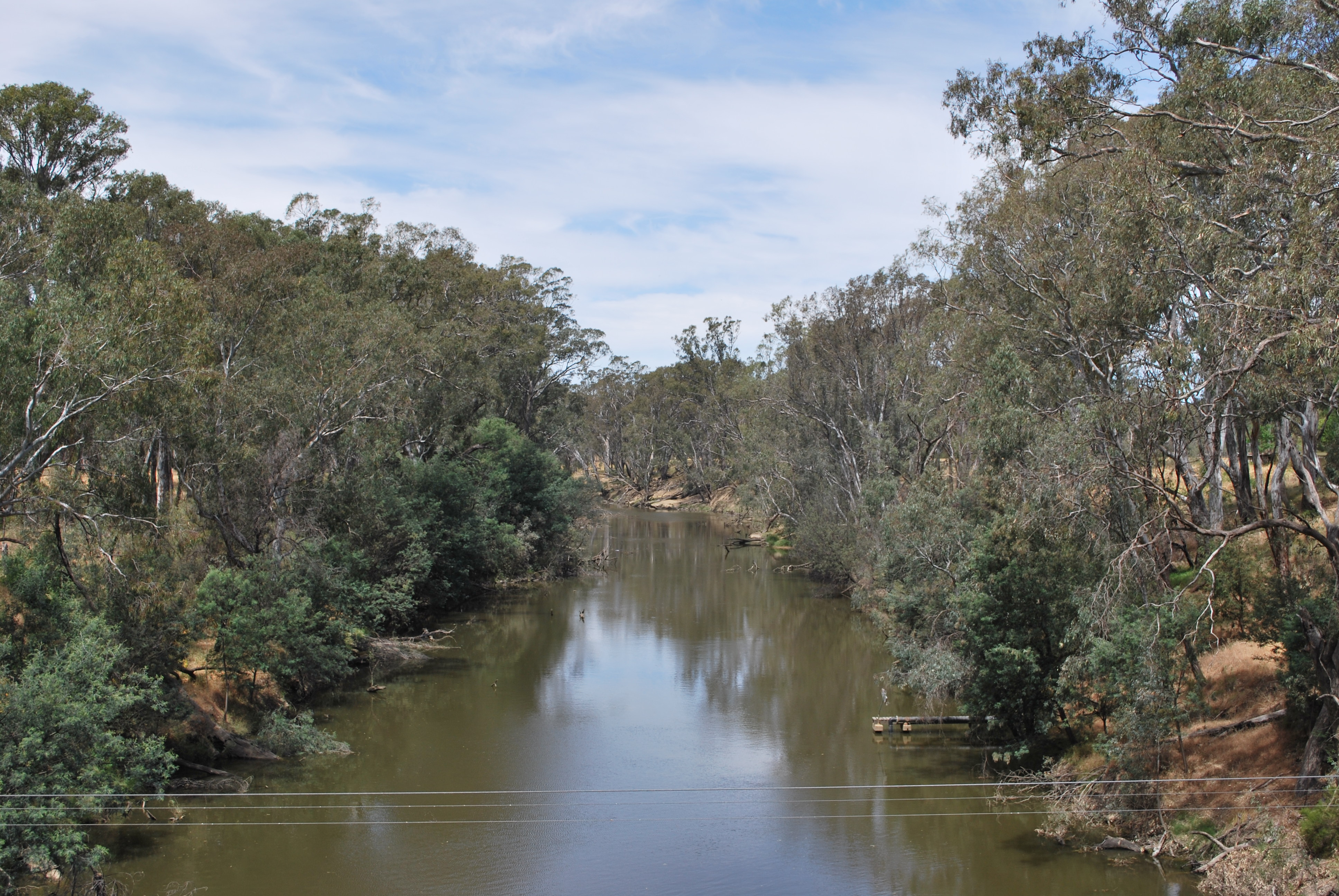
The lower course of the Goulburn River at Murchison, 2009

The Goulburn Heritage River was declared in 1992 in recognition of its unique natural, recreational, scenic and cultural values. In June 2010, the Victorian Government created the Lower Goulburn National Park to protect and enhance the river red gum forests in Victoria. Red River Gum forests line the Goulburn River for most of its length, reaching up to 45 metres (148 ft) in height and live more than 500 years. The trees need periods of flooding and can survive inundation for months. Their seeds are washed onto higher ground during a flood and germinate and grow before the next flood reaches them. Hollows and broken branches provide nesting for galahs, cockatoos, cockatiels and various parrots, while fallen branches provide habitat for other animals.

Additional activities on the river include canoeing, sightseeing and picnicking, swimming, and fishing, with Murray cod, golden perch and spiny freshwater crayfish found in the lower reaches of the river. In the upper reaches, there are extensive forests of very tall mountain ash and mixed species and may be described as typical trout streams.

== Etymology ==
In the Aboriginal Taungurung language, the river has several names: Warring, meaning "big or large water"; Bayyango, where Thomas Mitchell noted that this word appeared to be a generic word for river, and (also in the Ngurai-illam Wurrung dialect/language) Omio with no clearly defined meaning. In the Yorta Yorta language, the river has several names: Koninner, meaning "the country at the junction of the Murray and Goulburn rivers"; Gungupna, with gupna meaning "deep waterholes"; and Gaiyila, meaning "father of waters".

Hamilton Hume and William Hovell explored the area in 1824, naming the Goulburn River in honour of Major Frederick Goulburn, the first Colonial Secretary of New South Wales.

== See also ==
- Goulburn–Murray Water
- List of rivers of Australia § Victoria
- Murray Darling Basin Authority
