= Tolmie, Victoria =

Tolmie
- Town
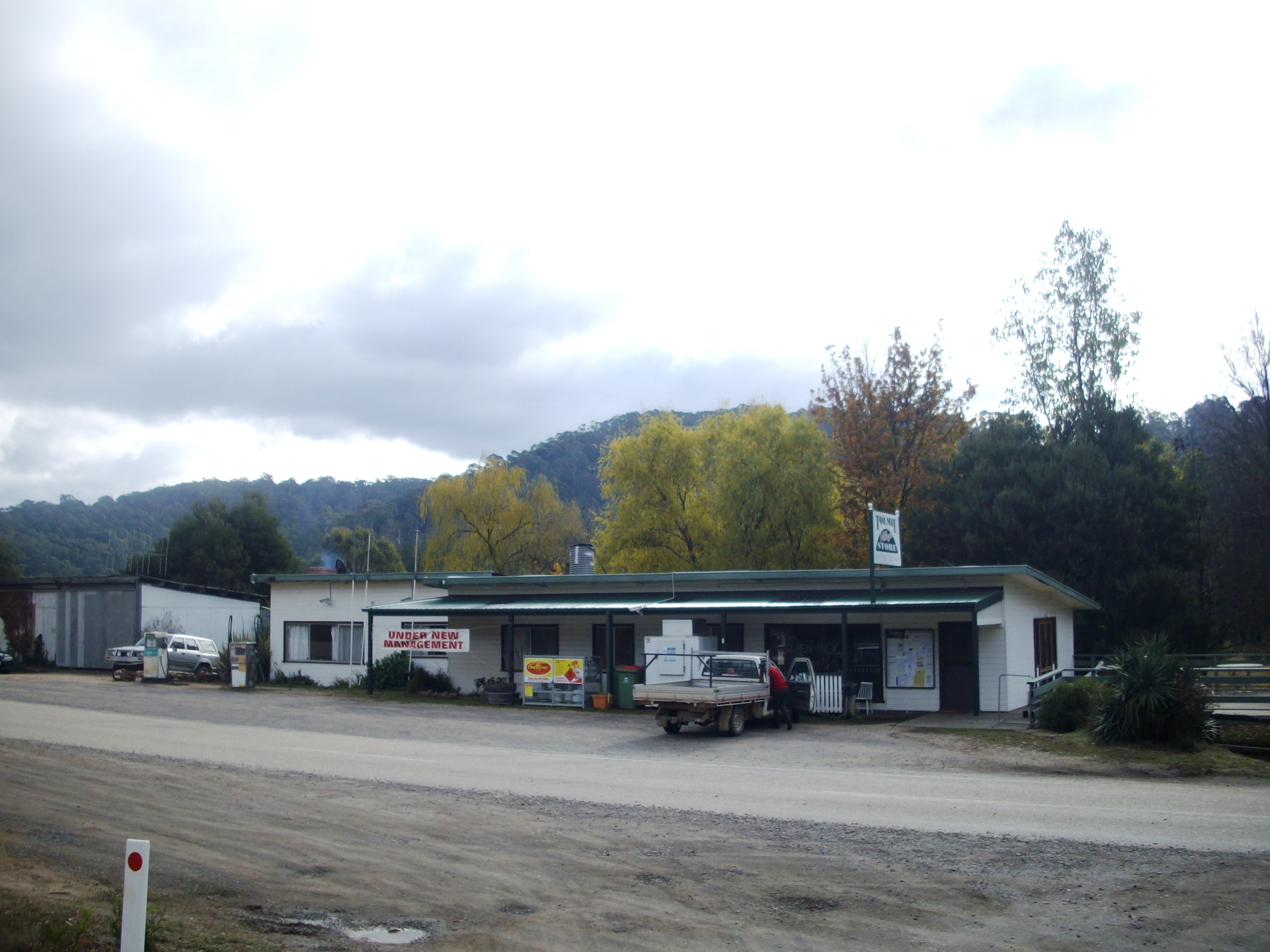
- General store

- Interactive map of Tolmie
- Coordinates: 36°56′S 146°15′E
- Country: Australia
- State: Victoria
- Region: Hume
- LGAs: Shire of Mansfield; Rural City of Wangaratta; Rural City of Benalla
- Location: 22 km (14 mi) from Mansfield; 213 km (132 mi) from Melbourne

Government
  - State electorate: Ovens Valley
  - Federal division: Indi
- Elevation: 782 m (2,566 ft)

Population
  - Total: 447 (2016 census)
- Postcode: 3723
- Mean max temp: 15.2 °C (59.4 °F)
- Mean min temp: 6.9 °C (44.4 °F)
- Annual rainfall: 1,656.9 mm (65.23 in)

Tolmie is a town in east-central Victoria, Australia. It is located 22 kilometres (14 mi) north-east of Mansfield in the Victorian high country. At the 2011 census, Tolmie had a population of 547.

The Post Office opened on 1 February 1877 as Wombat, was renamed Tolmie in 1879, and closed in 1971.

The town is named after Ewen Tolmie who was born in Scotland in 1816 and died at his homestead, Dueran, in 1883.

The region surrounding the town is heavily forested and much of it was devastated during the bushfires in 2006/07.

Each year the town holds an annual community event in February or March at the Tolmie Recreation Reserve. The day includes foot races and novelty events, a dog jump, woodchopping and horse events as well as raffles, many displays and an evening bush dance. The event typically attracts several thousand visitors. In 2023, the 136th Tolmie Sports Day was held on March 4.

== Climate ==
Due to its latitude and elevation, Tolmie is frequently affected by snow and chilling rains throughout much of the year. Climate data are sourced from the old Rubicon S.E.C. Sawmill at an elevation of 838 metres (2,749 ft). Tolmie is one of the coldest localities by mean maximum temperature in mainland Australia, second only to Aberfeldy. On average there are 8.7 snowy days per annum at the sawmill.

It is the second wettest locality in Victoria behind Bogong, possibly the wettest anywhere in mainland Australia's temperate zone. Cloud cover is extremely heavy in the winter months, as evident by the afternoon relative humidity readings. There is a pronounced autumnal lag, with March being notably warmer than December.

Climate data for Rubicon SEC (1943–1993); 838 m AMSL; 37.34° S, 145.85° E
Month	Jan	Feb	Mar	Apr	May	Jun	Jul	Aug	Sep	Oct	Nov	Dec	Year
Record high °C (°F)	37.5 (99.5)	36.7 (98.1)	32.9 (91.2)	27.5 (81.5)	20.5 (68.9)	16.8 (62.2)	16.7 (62.1)	18.5 (65.3)	23.9 (75.0)	26.7 (80.1)	32.9 (91.2)	32.9 (91.2)	37.5 (99.5)
Mean daily maximum °C (°F)	23.7 (74.7)	23.5 (74.3)	20.6 (69.1)	15.6 (60.1)	11.0 (51.8)	8.3 (46.9)	7.0 (44.6)	8.3 (46.9)	11.3 (52.3)	14.5 (58.1)	17.6 (63.7)	20.9 (69.6)	15.2 (59.3)
Mean daily minimum °C (°F)	11.7 (53.1)	12.1 (53.8)	10.6 (51.1)	7.6 (45.7)	5.3 (41.5)	3.2 (37.8)	2.1 (35.8)	2.6 (36.7)	3.9 (39.0)	6.0 (42.8)	7.7 (45.9)	9.8 (49.6)	6.9 (44.4)
Record low °C (°F)	2.4 (36.3)	2.8 (37.0)	0.1 (32.2)	0.0 (32.0)	−2.0 (28.4)	−2.6 (27.3)	−2.8 (27.0)	−5.6 (21.9)	−2.9 (26.8)	−1.8 (28.8)	−0.4 (31.3)	1.0 (33.8)	−5.6 (21.9)
Average precipitation mm (inches)	70.5 (2.78)	53.9 (2.12)	73.6 (2.90)	115.1 (4.53)	181.4 (7.14)	187.6 (7.39)	228.4 (8.99)	227.3 (8.95)	164.4 (6.47)	149.8 (5.90)	112.7 (4.44)	89.1 (3.51)	1,656.9 (65.23)
Average precipitation days (≥ 0.2 mm)	7.4	6.8	8.5	10.7	15.7	16.8	19.9	20.2	16.0	15.6	12.9	10.3	160.8
Average afternoon relative humidity (%)	52	55	60	67	81	86	85	79	71	68	61	56	68
Source: Australian Bureau of Meteorology; Rubicon SEC
