= Maindample =

- Town
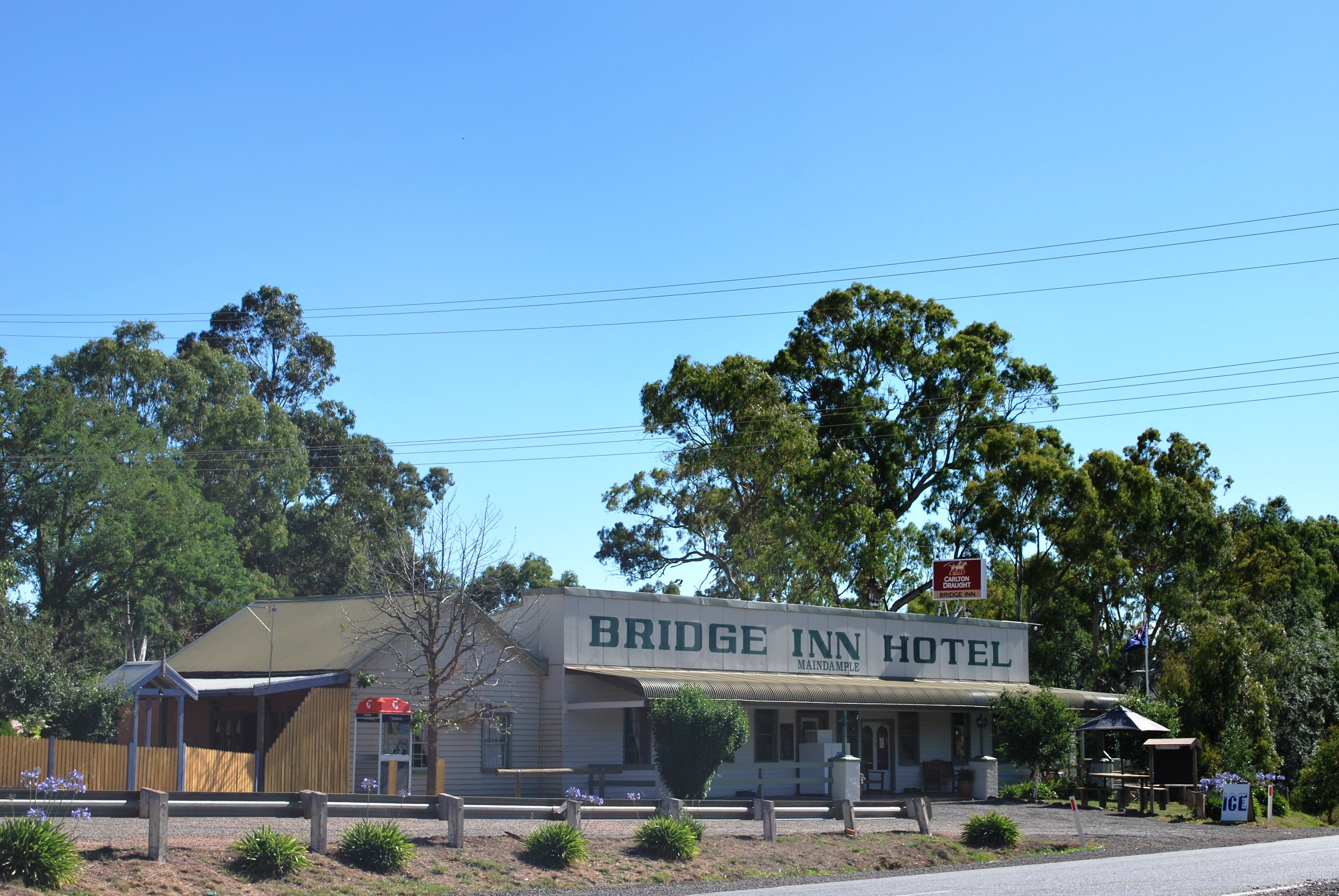
- The Bridge Inn Hotel, burnt down in 2010

- Coordinates: 37°02′0″S 145°56′0″E
- Country: Australia
- State: Victoria
- Region: Hume
- LGA: Shire of Mansfield
- Location: 174 km (108 mi) NE of Melbourne; 14 km (8.7 mi) W of Mansfield; 7 km (4.3 mi) E of Bonnie Doon

Government
  - State electorate: Eildon
  - Federal division: Indi

Population
  - Total: 239 (2021 census)
- Postcode: 3723

Maindample is a town in north east Victoria (Australia). It is located in the Mansfield Shire local government area, 174 kilometres (108 mi) north east of the state capital Melbourne.

South, just outside the town, are twin hills known as The Paps. The Aboriginal name for these is Maindample.

The Maroondah Highway passes near the town on route to the lower alpine region of Victoria.

== History ==
The area was a hunting and gathering ground for the Taungurung people.

Maindample was part of a 140,000 acre pastoral run taken up by overlanders and squattors James Watson and Alexander Hunter in 1840 acting as agents for a group of Scottish aristocrat investors. Watson and Hunter ran into financial difficulties in the economic depression that began in 1840 and were insolvent by March 1843.

The run was divided into four separate properties of which Maindample was one. When offered for sale in November 1846, Maindample station consisted of 27,000 acres, 3 huts and was stocked with "4,759 sheep (more or less) ... eight working bullocks, a dray, one horse and a "Rob Roy" saddle and bridle". The new owners, taking possession in January 1847, were William Highett and Thomas Willis. Highett was the sole licensee by March 1853 and this continued till June 1866.

The Parish of Maindample had been proclaimed by December 1860. An early resident of the area was Andrew Crockett JP.

=== Gold ===
Gold was discovered in 1867 and Maindample Reefs had a scattered population of 200 by September that year. There were 600 residents by February 1868. Two quartz crushing mills were built near the creek and a post office was established in April 1868. A police station was also established that year. At its peak as a mining town, Maindample had a population of almost 1,000. There was a school, several general stores and about twenty pubs and hotels. Kelson's Royal Hotel offered "first-class restaurant meals at all hours", and had a Cobb and Co booking office. Other pubs included Powel's Reefer's Hotel, the Pig and Whistle, the Royal Hotel and Mac's Hotel. The latter was destroyed by fire in 1894, rebuilt, and burned down again in 1904. The Bridge Inn Hotel was built in 1876.

The bushranger Harry Power was active in the area after escaping from prison in 1869. It was reported in the press at the time that, "He visited Maindample and spoke very contemptuously of the place as not being worth the trouble of sticking up.”

There was a blacksmith by 1872, located next to Mac's Hotel. The site for a township was surveyed in 1875. There was a butchers and a small bakers store by 1899. And near the railway station there was a sawmill (1903–1913). There was also some dairying in the area. A progress association was formed in 1899. It lapsed and was reestablished in 2007.

Important pastoral properties established in the area in the nineteenth century include Wappan Station, Maindample Park and Barjarg Station.

Tenders were called in 1888 for the construction of a railway line from Cathkin to Mansfield. The rail line was to have eight stations including one at Maindample. The line had reached Maindample by January 1891.

The first meeting of the Maindample Racing Club was held at Mansfield in fine weather in front of a large crowd in May 1891. The club continued till the 1964-65 racing season after which it was amalgamated with the Mansfield Racing Club.

=== 20th-century ===
A public hall was built in 1916. It was used to host concerts, balls, dances and meetings. For instance, in October 1944 a meeting was held to form the Maindample Bush Fire Brigade (Maindample Rural Fire Brigade).

The decline in mining saw residents depart in search of employment elsewhere. By 1899, the town consisted of only about 10 houses, a general store and two pubs. The population had fallen to 75 by 1903. The Tallarook-Mansfield railway ceased to operate in 1978 and it is now a rail trail. The post office closed in 1989.

In October 1973, a Nomad prototype aircraft crash-landed on a roadway near the Bridge Inn Hotel. None of the four people aboard was injured.

The state primary school was pulled down and rebuilt in 1916. It closed in 1948 but a Rudolph Steiner School was established in the town in 1986.

== 21st-century ==
The Bridge Inn Hotel, a popular stop over for travellers to the Victorian ski fields, burned down in 2010.

Modest growth saw the population increase to 239 by the 2021 census.

Businesses in or near modern Maindample include a plant nursery and a helicopter hire firm.

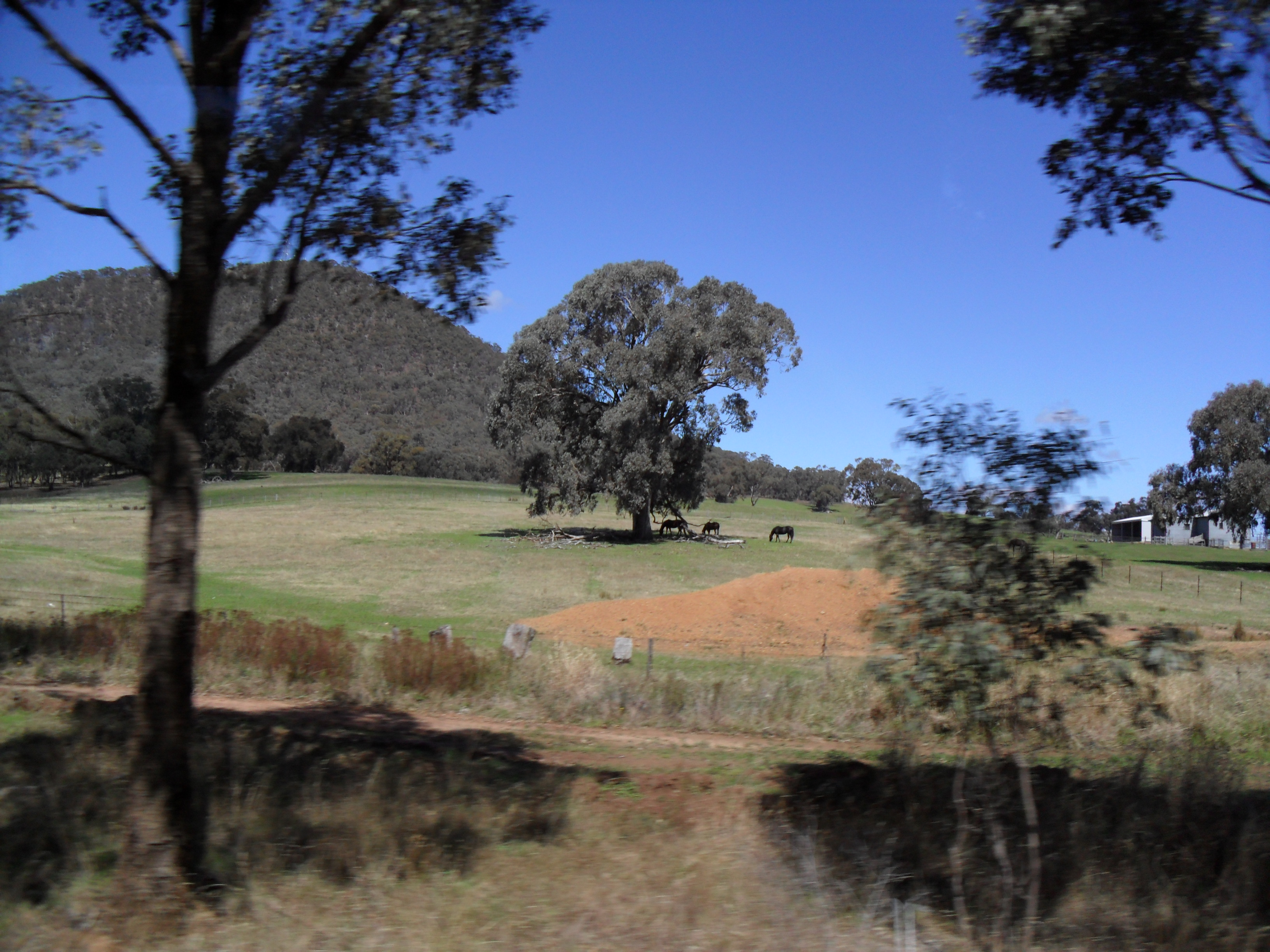
Farm in vicinity of Maindample, The Paps reserve in background

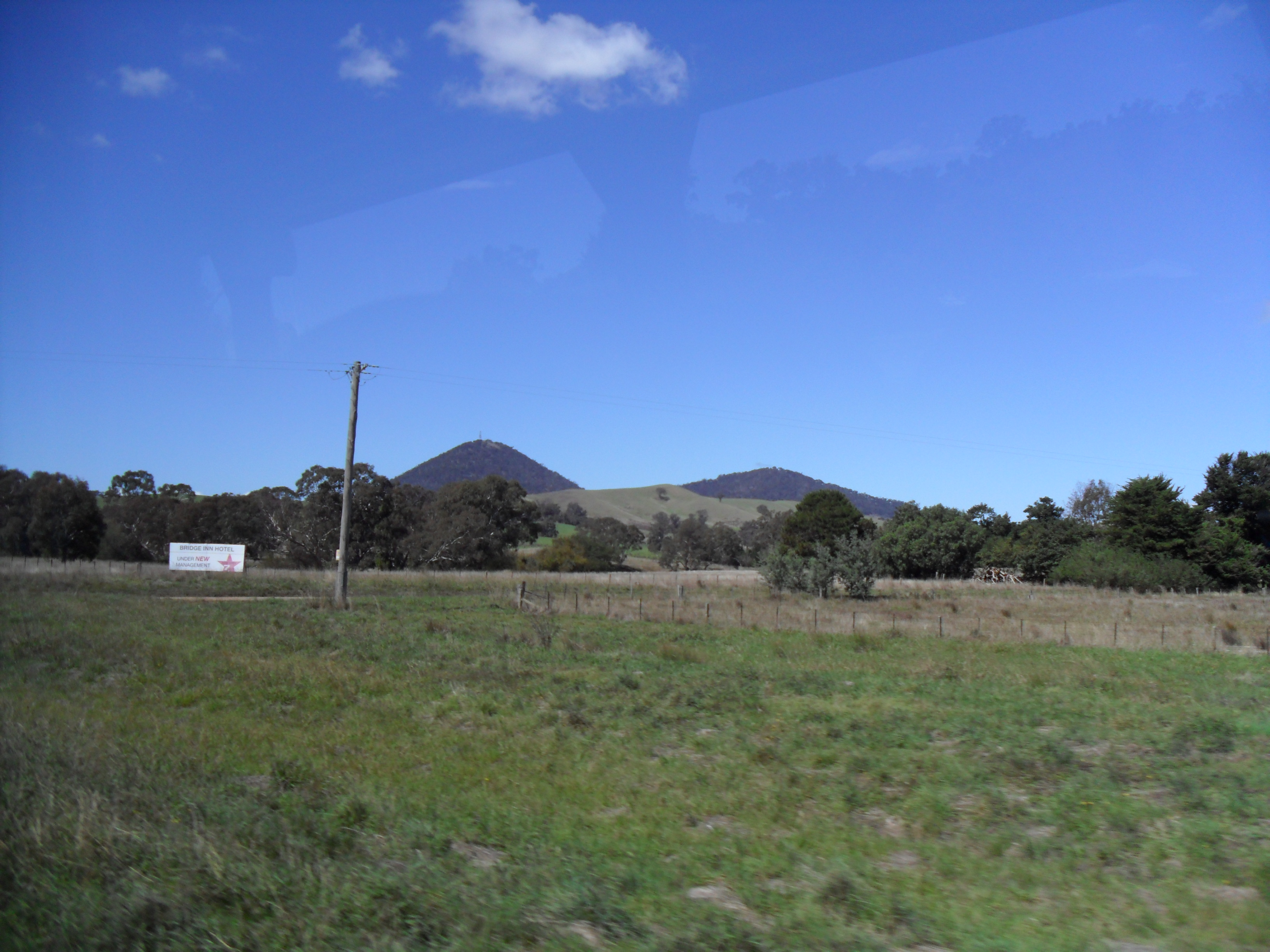
Fields near Maindample

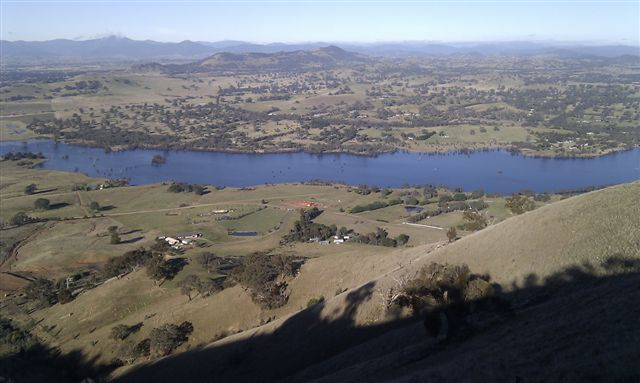
View to N/E from The Paps

== See also ==
- Maindample railway station, Victoria
