= List of places on the Victorian Heritage Register in the Shire of Mansfield =

This is a list of places on the Victorian Heritage Register in the Shire of Mansfield in Victoria, Australia. The Victorian Heritage Register is maintained by the Heritage Council of Victoria.

The Victorian Heritage Register, as of 2026, lists the following eight state-registered places within the Shire of Mansfield:

Place name	Place #	Location	Suburb or Town	Co-ordinates	Built	State registered	Photo
Howqua United Gold Treatment Works	VHR H1279	Howqua Hills Track	Howqua Hills	37.198583°S 146.337361°E	1890s	19 December 1996	
Leichardt Gold Crushing Battery	VHR H1914	Abbot Creek Track	Woods Point	37.561250°S 146.315944°E	1886	13 November 2003	
Mansfield Court House	VHR H1474	88 High Street	Mansfield	37.052437°S 146.087602°E	1879	20 August 1982	
Police Memorial	VHR H1538	High Street and Highett Street	Mansfield	37.052111°S 146.088083°E	1880	20 August 1982	
Police Stables	VHR H1540	5 Curia Street	Mansfield	37.052889°S 146.086722°E	1889	10 February 1988	
Royal Standard Gold Battery Site	VHR H1270	Royal Standard Spur Track	Woods Point	37.580222°S 146.363750°E	unknown	19 December 1996	
Spring Creek Sawmill and Seasoning Works	VHR H1824	Mount Samaria State Park	Bridge Creek	36.867000°S 146.094528°E	1923	17 June 1999	
Stockyard Creek Gold Mining Diversion Sluice	VHR H1255	Howqua Track	Howqua Hills	37.184472°S 146.313444°E	unknown	19 December 1996	
