= Kevington, Victoria =

Kevington
- Town
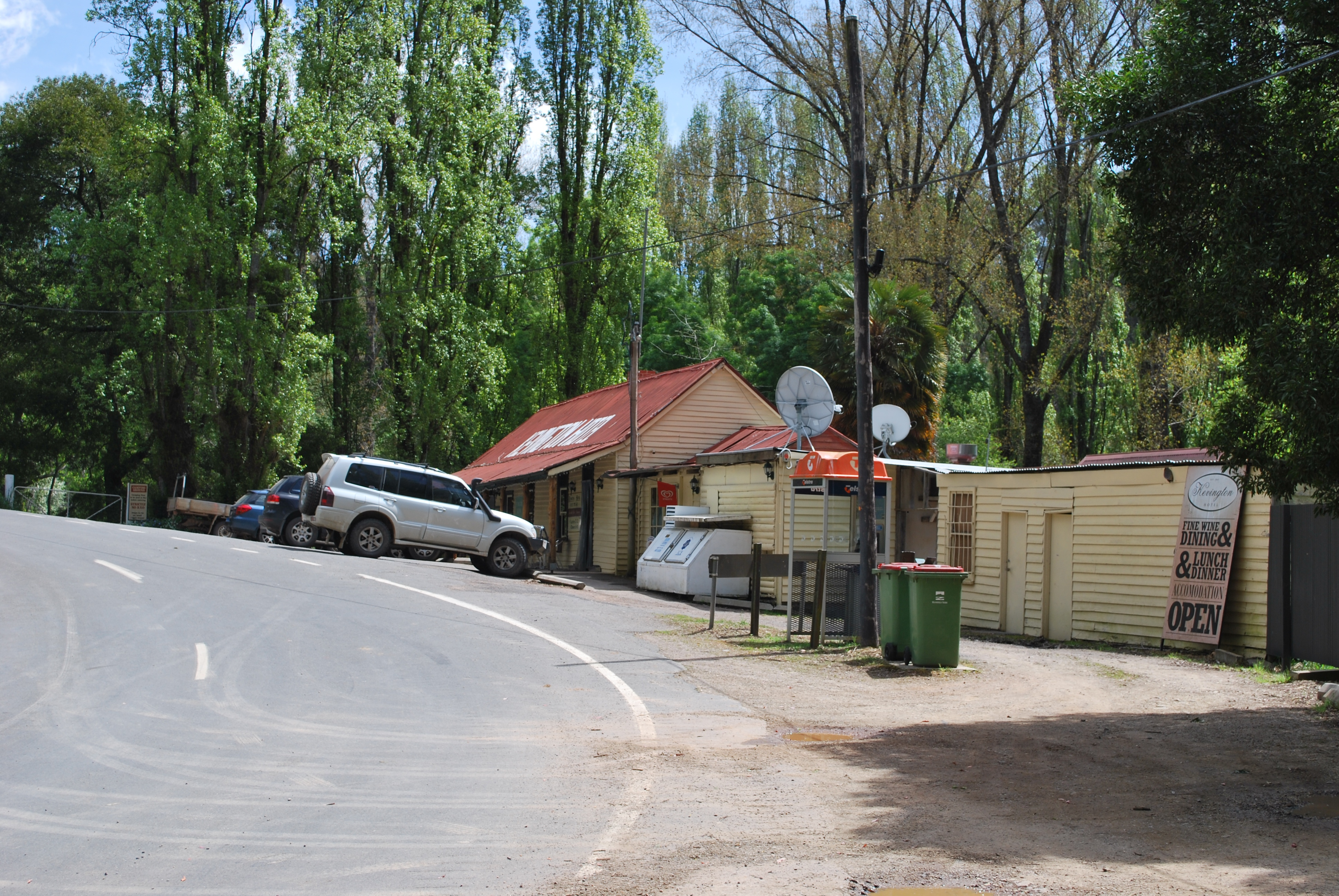
- Kevington Hotel

- Coordinates: 37°22′S 146°09′E
- Country: Australia
- State: Victoria
- Region: Hume
- LGA: Shire of Mansfield
- Location: 163 km (101 mi) NE of Melbourne; 57 km (35 mi) S of Mansfield; 23 km (14 mi) SE of Jamieson

Government
  - State electorate: Eildon
  - Federal division: Indi

Population
  - Total: 36 (SAL 2021)
- Postcode: 3723

Kevington is a town in Victoria, Australia, located south of Jamieson on the Mansfield - Woods Point Road, in the Shire of Mansfield. The Goulburn River runs through Kevington.

The town began as a small settlement in 1862 when J. S. Garrett opened a beer house on the road between Jamieson and Gaffneys Creek. When gold was discovered at the nearby Lucks All and Star Of The West mines, the settlement grew to include stores, butchers, and private residences. The town was surveyed and named Kevington. Eventually the town died, and the nearby town of Mack's Creek took on the name Kevington. The Post Office at Mack's Creek opened on 1 November 1865 and was renamed Kevington on 1 October 1884 (closing in 1974).

The Kevington Hotel (popularly known as the Kevington Hilton or the Kevy Pub) currently stands on the site of Garrett's original beer house. The Kevington Hotel was refurbished between 2007 and 2017.
