= Bonnie Doon railway station =

Former railway station in Victoria, Australia

Coordinates: 37°01′23″S 145°51′25″E

Bonnie Doon

General information
- Line: Mansfield

Other information
- Status: Closed

History
- Opened: 7 May 1891
- Closed: 8 November 1978

Services
Preceding station	Disused railways	Following station
Woodfield	Mansfield line	Maindample
	List of closed railway stations in Victoria	
Location

Bonnie Doon is a former railway station in Bonnie Doon, Victoria, Australia. The tracks have been removed, but some structures remain at the site of the former station.
