= Ancona, Victoria =

Ancona
- Town
- Coordinates: 36°59′03″S 145°47′55″E
- Country: Australia
- State: Victoria
- Region: Hume
- LGA: Shire of Mansfield
- Location: 155 km (96 mi) NE of Melbourne; 32 km (20 mi) W of Mansfield; 41 km (25 mi) SE of Euroa

Government
  - State electorate: Eildon
  - Federal division: Indi

Population
  - Total: 99 (2021 census)
- Postcode: 3715

Ancona is a locality in Victoria, Australia named after Ancona in Italy.

Settled late, a Post Office (briefly named Ancorna) was not opened until 15 September 1905 (closed 1968). It is located on Ancona Road, in a valley in the Shire of Mansfield local government area.
