= Shire of Mansfield =

Coordinates: 37°03′00″S 146°05′00″E

Mansfield Shire
- Local government area
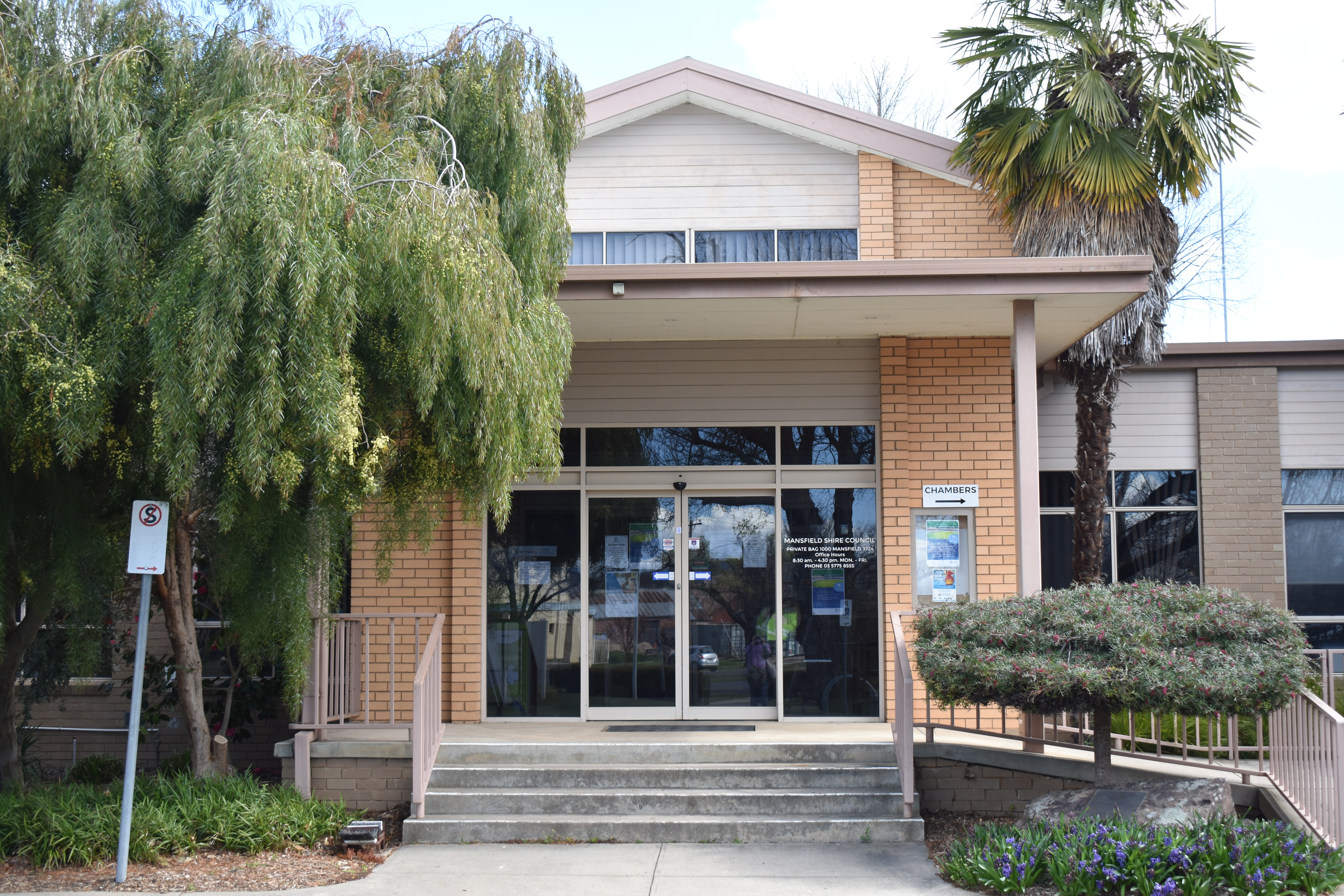
- Location in Victoria Council offices in Mansfield

- Interactive map of Mansfield Shire
- Country: Australia
- State: Victoria
- Region: Hume
- Established: 17 October 2002
- Council seat: Mansfield

Government
  - Mayor: Cr Steve Rabie
  - State electorate: Eildon
  - Federal division: Indi

Area
  - Total: 3,844 km^{2} (1,484 sq mi)

Population
  - Total: 10,178 (2021 census)
  - Density: 2.6478/km^{2} (6.8577/sq mi)
- Website: Mansfield Shire
LGAs around Mansfield Shire
Strathbogie	Benalla	Wangaratta
Murrindindi	Mansfield Shire	Wellington
Yarra Ranges	Baw Baw	Wellington

The Shire of Mansfield is a local government area in the Hume region of Victoria, Australia, located in the north-east part of the state. It covers an area of 3,844 square kilometres (1,484 mi^{2}) and in August 2021, had a population of 10,178.

It includes the towns of Mansfield, Maindample, Mount Buller, Bonnie Doon, Jamieson, Kevington, Merrijig, Tolmie and Woods Point. It was formed in 2002 from the de-amalgamation of the Delatite Shire into the current shire and the Rural City of Benalla.

The de-amalgamation was the only successful de-amalgamation following the Kennett Government's policy of local government mergers. It was the result of organised political activity, with parallels to other autonomy movements.

The Shire is governed and administered by Mansfield Shire Council, its seat of local government and administrative centre is located at the council headquarters in Mansfield. The Shire is named after the main urban settlement located in the north of the LGA, that is Mansfield, which is also the LGA's most populous urban centre with a population of 4,360.

The Shire is bordered by the Rural City of Benalla, the Shire of Baw Baw, the Shire of Murrindindi, the Shire of Yarra Ranges, the Shire of Strathbogie and the Shire of Wellington. There are two unincorporated areas within the shire; the areas around Mount Buller and Mount Stirling.

== Council ==
=== Current composition ===
The Shire has an unsubdivided structure, with five councillors elected to represent the community across the shire.

=== Administration and governance ===
The council meets in the council chambers at the council headquarters in the Mansfield Municipal Offices, which is also the location of the council's administrative activities. It also provides customer services at its administrative centre in Mansfield.

== Townships and localities ==
According to the 2021 census, the shire had a population of 10,178, compared to 8,584 in the 2016 census.

Population
Locality	2016	2021
Ancona	84	99
Barjarg	132	141
Barwite	228	269
Bonnie Doon	570	666
Boorolite	143	166
Bridge Creek^	97	117
Creek Junction^	16	34
Delatite	15	13
Enochs Point^	0	3
Gaffneys Creek	10	3
Goughs Bay	261	328
Howes Creek	70	67
Howqua	110	158
Howqua Hills	4	5
Howqua Inlet	56	63
Jamieson	301	382
Kanumbra^	59	53
Kevington	43	36
Knockwood	0	0
Lake Eildon	7	3
Macs Cove	91	121
Maindample	212	239
Mansfield	4,787	5,541
Matlock^	4	7
Merrijig	549	721
Merton^	190	216
Mirimbah^	*	0
Mount Buller^	243	333
Mountain Bay	43	54
Piries	58	66
Reynard^	0	0
Sawmill Settlement	88	86
Tolmie^	447	547
Woodfield	36	62
Woods Point	37	33

^ - Territory divided with another LGA
* - Not noted in 2016 Census

A1 Mine Settlement was a former town in the Shire of Mansfield.

== See also ==
- List of localities (Victoria)
- List of places on the Victorian Heritage Register in the Shire of Mansfield
