= Matlock, Victoria =

Matlock
- Town
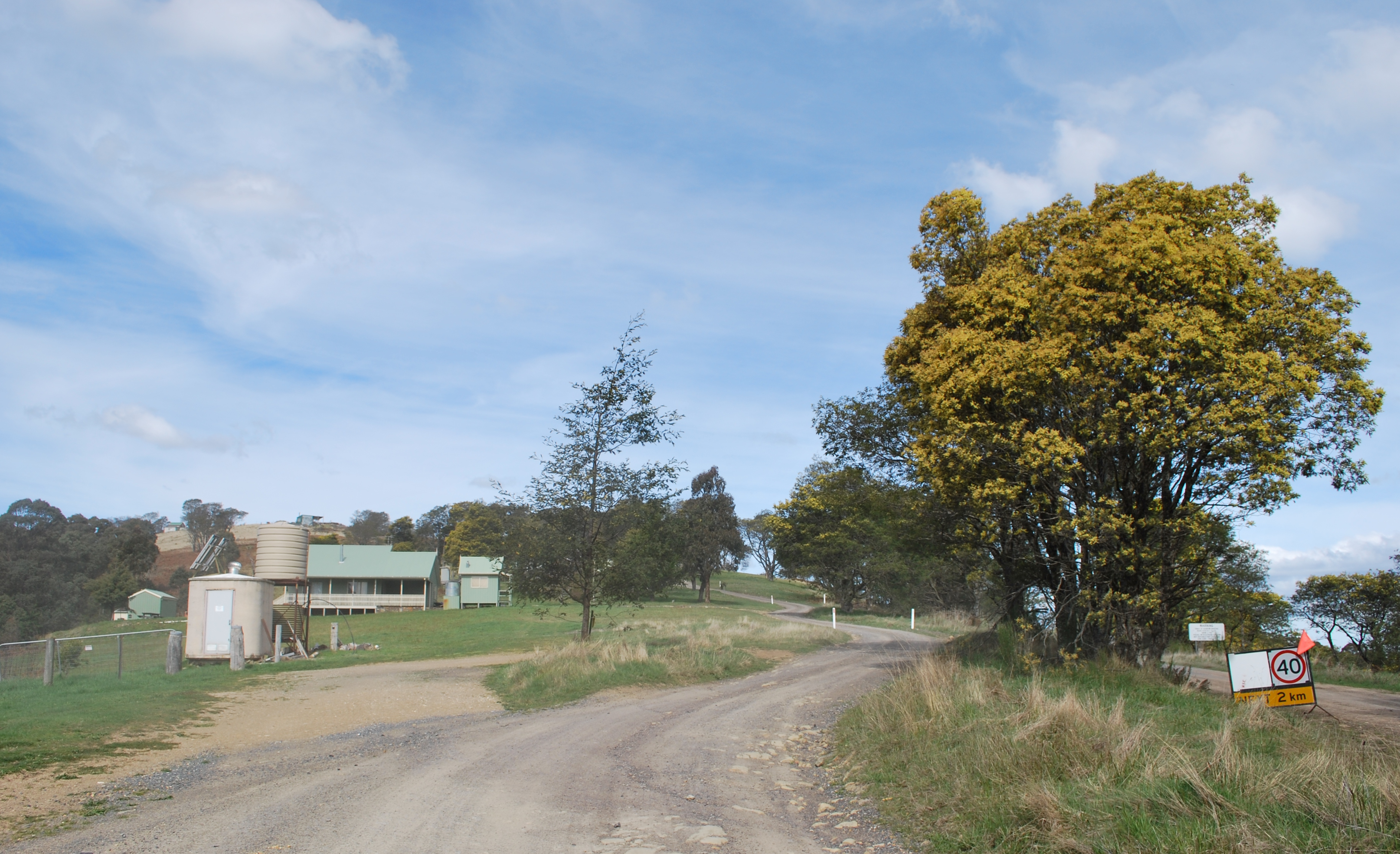

- Coordinates: 37°36′S 146°13′E
- Country: Australia
- State: Victoria
- Region: Hume
- LGAs: Shire of Mansfield; Shire of Yarra Ranges
- Location: 142 km (88 mi) NE of Melbourne; 81 km (50 mi) S of Mansfield; 65 km (40 mi) NE of Warburton
- Established: 1863

Government
  - State electorate: Eildon
  - Federal division: Indi
- Elevation: 1,213 m (3,980 ft)

Population
  - Total: 7 (2021 census)
- Postcode: 3723
- Annual rainfall: 1,574.7 mm (62.00 in)

Matlock is a locality in Victoria, Australia, located about 140 kilometres north-east of Melbourne, located within the Shires of Mansfield and Yarra Ranges local government areas. Matlock recorded a population of 7 at the 2021 census.

The locality is named after the township that existed at two separate locations from the early 1860s to about the 1930s. The rural locality is along the Walhalla Road (between Marysville and Walhalla), about 140 kilometres north-east of Melbourne, high in the Victorian alpine region on the Great Dividing Range. The location of Matlock township from the early 1860s to 1873 is on a barren hilltop known as the Matlock Hill Historical Area, marked by a snow shelter at the roadside picnic area and the remnants of a cemetery. At 1,213 metres (3,979 feet) above sea-level at its first location Matlock was the highest township in Victoria.

== History ==
=== The hilltop township ===
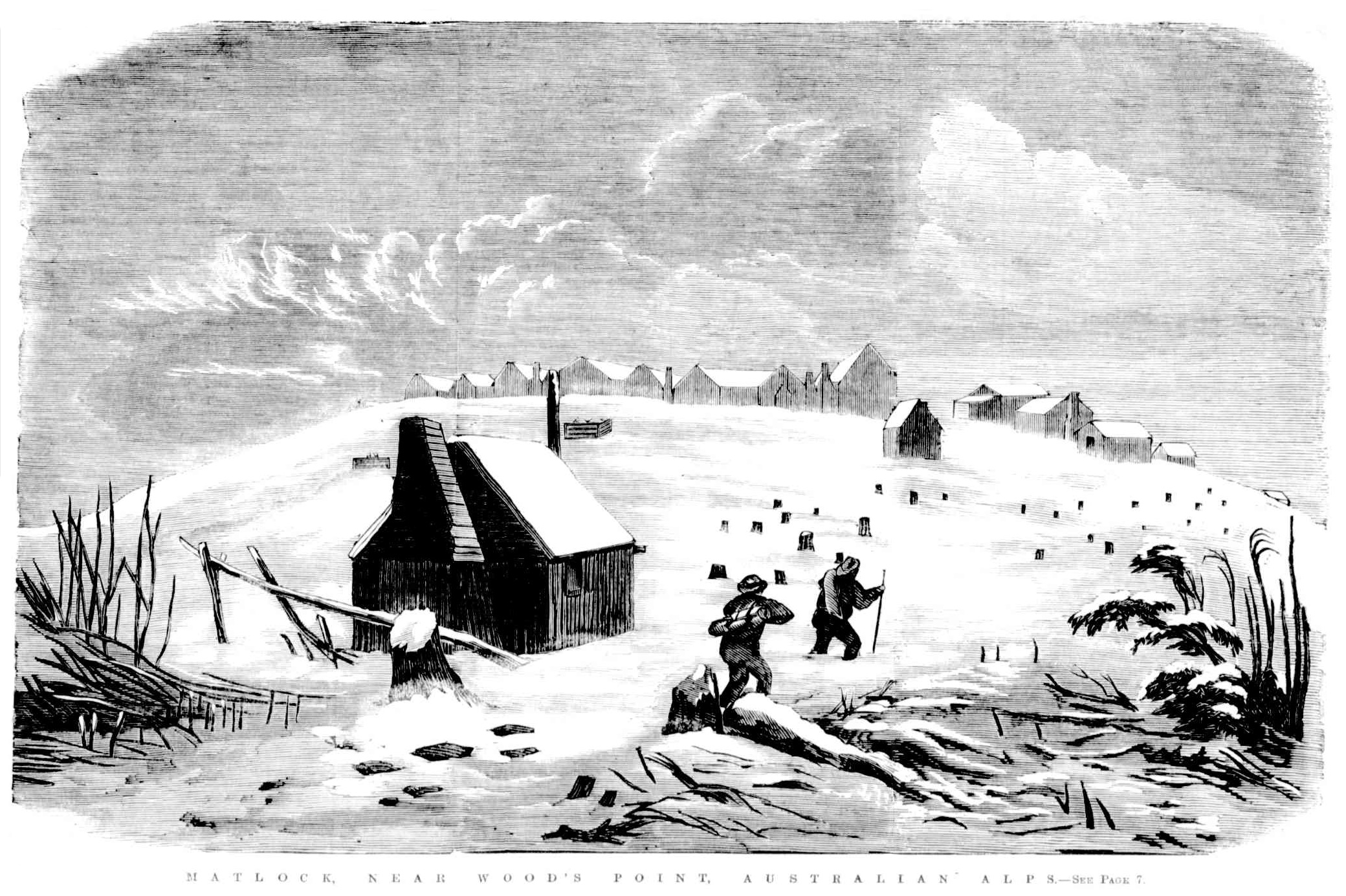
Matlock township – illustration published in Australian News for Home Readers, 19 April 1865.

In December 1863 the policeman Sub-Inspector Brook Smith was travelling in the region of recently opened goldfields in the Victorian alpine country and reported that “quite a township has sprung up halfway between Jericho and Wood’s Point called Emerald Hill”. The settlement had “two stores and restaurants besides several other buildings being erected [including] a large sized hotel of planks with shingle roof”.

The township of Emerald Hill (later Matlock) arose in the early 1860s as a trading centre between the Woods Point and Jordan goldfields. It was situated in an exposed location on the top of a hill above the Upper Goulburn and Jordan valleys and was itself flanked by three nearby gold-mines, the Loch Fyne, All Nations and Emerald Reef. A number of tracks converged at Emerald Hill: the Jamieson Track from Wood's Point, the Yarra Track to Melbourne, McEvoy's Track from Gippsland and the B.B. Track to the Jericho gold-field. Totally exposed on the crown of the hill, the settlement was subject to extremes of weather, particularly in winter when deep snow, sleet and gale-force winds were commonplace.

In February 1864 the settlement was surveyed and allotments and roads marked out. The Assistant Commissioner for Lands and Survey determined that 'Matlock' would be a more suitable name for the township as 'Emerald Hill' was already being used for a Melbourne suburb (later South Melbourne). In April two police constables were stationed at Matlock, accommodated initially in the Royal Mail Hotel. In July 1864 a post office was established at Matlock under the charge of Theophilus Singleton.

At its peak, the town had a population of around 300, and included several suburbs including Thackery, Alhambra, Mutton Town, and Harpers Creek. During the early 1860s the specimens of gold found in the Matlock area were described as “splendid” and the “crushings were for the most part sensational”, but in the end “the gold either pinched out or became unremunerative”.

In the 1871 Census Matlock had a population of 257.

=== Destruction by fire ===
On 15 December 1873, with a “terrific wind” blowing and a bushfire burning nearby, embers started a fire in the roof of the Royal Mail Hotel at Matlock. The alarm was raised, “but owing to the high winds and the scarcity of water the whole street was quickly in a blaze”. The fire quickly spread through the wooden buildings in the town until the whole of Matlock, with the exception of Donaldson's store, was left as “a mass of ruins”. Two children died in the fire and “many persons were severely burned in their endeavours to save life and property”.

A year after the destructive fire, in late December 1874, a visitor to the region recorded his impressions of the devastated township, describing the scene as presenting “a most deplorable appearance”. The whole of Matlock township “with the exception of two or three houses having been burned to the ground… and the ruins have never been touched from that day to this”. He concluded: “It is a sad wreck, and shows but too plainly how soon even a flourishing gold mining township in Gippsland can vanish into obscurity”.

In March 1882, in an article regarding the discovery of “a wonderfully rich” gold-bearing reef half a mile from Matlock, the following was written about the settlement: “Ever since the great rush, some twenty years ago, the silence of desolation has brooded over this bare, bleak hill”. Matlock was described as “three or four huts” together with “the traces of some few others which have been left in the shape of ruined chimneys”. The reports of a "rich" discovery in 1882 failed to revive significant interest. Mining activities remained relatively subdued in the Matlock district until the mid-1890s.

=== Revival and decline ===
In July 1895 it was reported that “after a lapse of many years a slight mining revival has set in at Matlock”. The old Loch Fyne and All Nations mines “are now attracting attention”. In August a traveller to the area wrote: “New stores, shops, and residences are going up, and competent judges say that the mines at Matlock are only the beginning of enormous discoveries, and there certainly seems to be good indications”. By the following October Matlock was described as “the scene of bustle and activity and reminds you of earlier days”.

In the 1901 Census Matlock had a population of 303.

Matlock began to decline after the First World War, “but there were still a lot of buildings here in 1925."

The following description of Matlock was published in January 1933:

As Matlock is approached the timber disappears, revealing the remains of the settlement. In the background the summit of Mount Matlock (4500 ft.) rises as a bald hill, which commands a fine view of Mount Buller, the Baw Baws, and other peaks. The "settlement," once a prosperous hamlet, consists of three houses. One of them is a post-office. A painted notice on another proclaims in faltering characters that the proprietress is the possessor of a licence to sell colonial wines. At the foot of the hill a pile of stones and other debris mark the site of a school. Near by a mining shaft driven into the hillside remains a visible memorial to unsuccessful search for payable stone.

The Matlock Post Office closed in 1934.

In January 1939 bushfires “sweeping through the ranges from three directions” caused destruction “at the Matlock Mills where a large number of men were employed”. The fires “devastated the whole forest, reducing it to a blackened ruin and taking terrible toll of human lives”, including at Fitzpatrick's saw-mill in the Matlock Forest where fifteen people were killed (including the owner and his two sons).

By 1967 the sole remaining resident of Matlock was Mrs. J. Sutcliffe. Mrs. Sutcliffe's grandmother, Emily Fletcher, had been a licensed wine-seller in the township. In 1953 a saw-mill opened at Matlock, reviving the settlement somewhat, with 10 timber-cutters and millhands and two families occupying some of the old houses and three newly constructed dwellings. The sawmill operated until 1975. The Matlock Post Office reopened in 1956 (after the sawmill was established) and closed in 1970.
