= Aberfeldy, Victoria =

Locality in Victoria, Australia

Aberfeldy Victoria
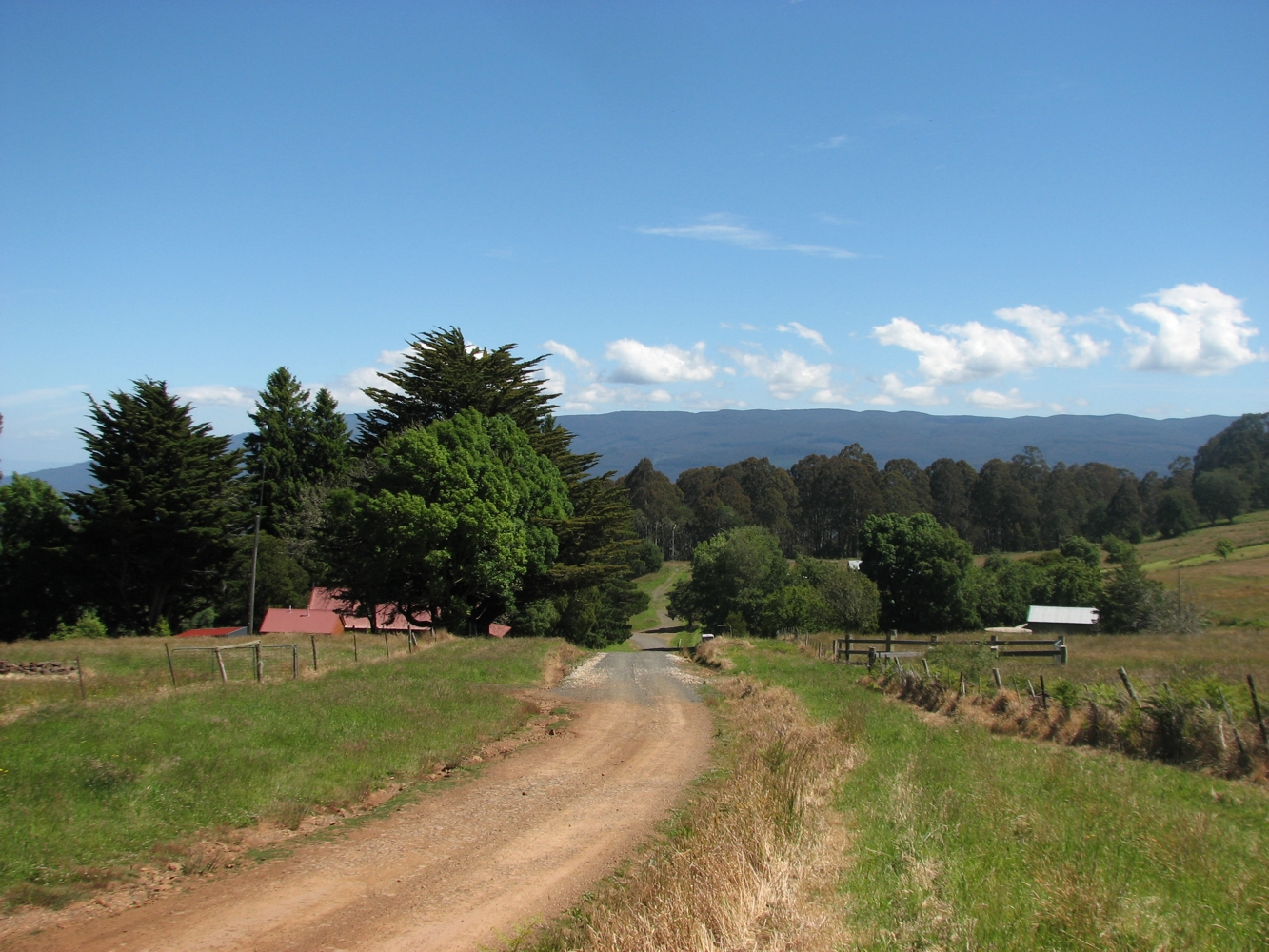
- Approach to the town from the north

- Coordinates: 37°41′S 146°22′E
- Population: 7 (2021 census)
- Established: 1871
- Postcode(s): 3825
- Elevation: 1,060 m (3,478 ft)
- Location: 165 km (103 mi) E of Melbourne; 72 km (45 mi) N of Moe; 25 km (16 mi) SE of Matlock
- LGA(s): Shire of Baw Baw
- State electorate(s): Narracan
- Federal division(s): Monash
Mean max temp	Mean min temp	Annual rainfall
12.9 °C; 55 °F	4.8 °C; 41 °F	1,083.5 mm 42.7 in

Aberfeldy is a locality in southern Victoria, Australia on Mount Lookout, northeast of the Thomson Dam, 125 km (78 mi) east of Melbourne.

== History ==
The area began to be inhabited in 1871 following the discovery of alluvial gold, although access was made difficult by the rugged terrain and the harsh winters, with sub-zero temperatures and much snow.

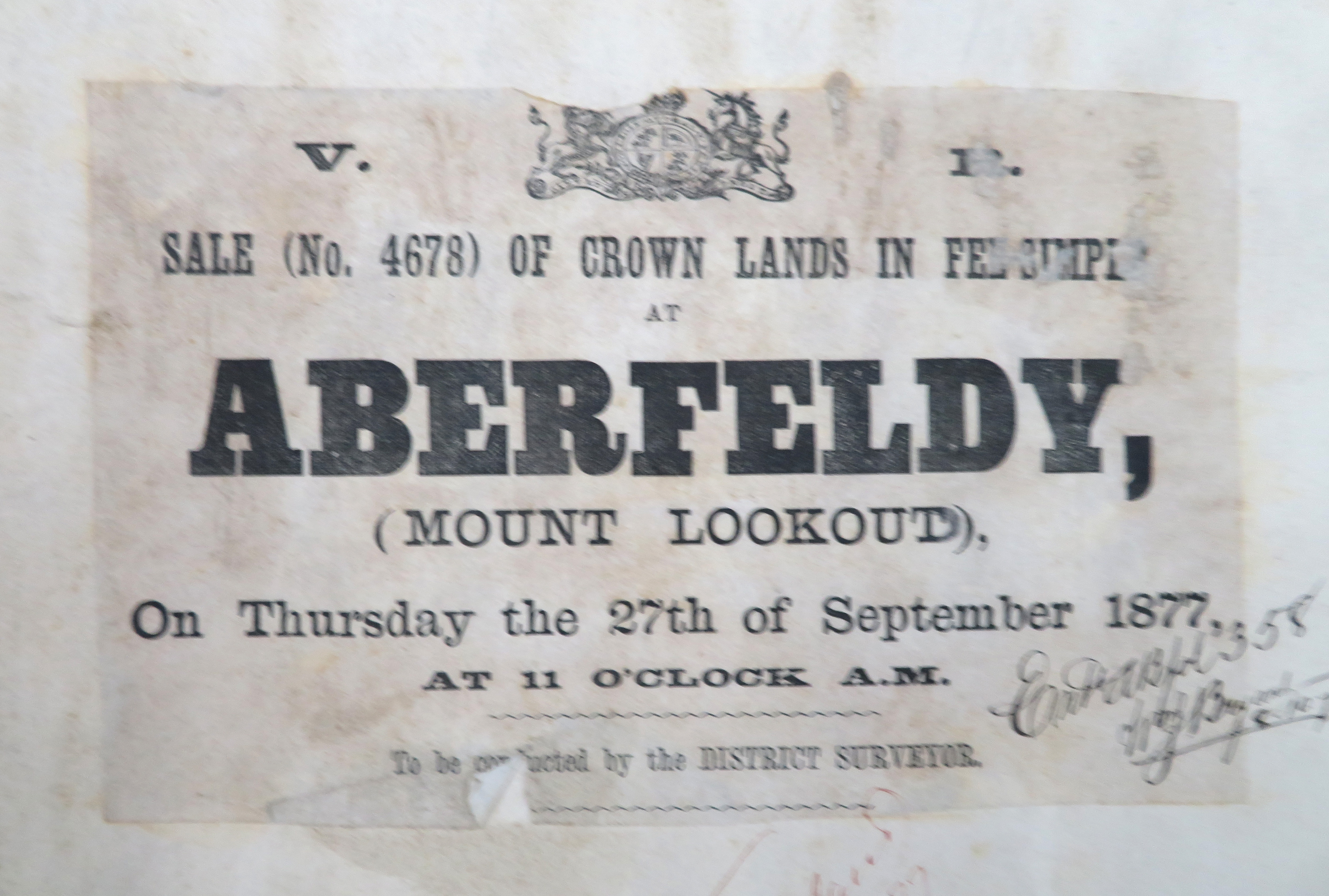
Aberfeldy Land Sale 1877, courtesy Public Records Office Victoria

The first Aberfeldy Post Office opened on 1 January 1872. It closed permanently in 1967. The postmaster from 1880 to 1884 was Henry Donaldson, whose sister, Elizabeth Donaldson had married the Aberfeldy butcher Thomas Dwyer, originally from Tipperary, Ireland.

The eldest of the three Dwyer children was John Patrick, born in Aberfeldy in 1879. His parents both died in 1884, so the children were taken in by their Scottish grandparents David and Annie Donaldson, who ran the general store in nearby Morwell. At that time Henry Donaldson also left Aberfeldy, going to be postmaster in Heyfield, Victoria.

John Partick Dwyer was a child prodigy and after qualifying as a solicitor in Melbourne he was called to the Bar at the age of 23. He moved to Western Australia in 1904 where he stood out as the possessor of a brilliant legal mind. He was appointed Chief Justice of Western Australia and was knighted in 1946, and then distinguished with a KCMG in 1949. He and his wife are buried together in a simple grave in Karrakatta Cemetery in Perth.

Aberfeldy was surveyed and proclaimed in 1885. It was initially known as Mount Lookout but was eventually renamed after the Scottish town of Aberfeldy. At its peak, the township had a population of around 500. After the end of the gold rush the townsfolk depended for their livelihood upon sheep and cattle grazing and the production of potatoes and other crops.

Following the First World War, the population diminished, although the locality managed to survive. The town hotel was burned down in 1938 and the Black Friday bush-fires of 1939 destroyed many of the buildings in the locality.

On 10 March 1942 a Curtiss P-40 Warhawk of the United States Army Air Force flown by Captain Joseph P McLaughlin crashed near Aberfeldy on a flight from Canberra to Laverton. The plane was discovered in 1948 and in 2005 the pilot's remains were identified and taken to be buried in Arlington National Cemetery.

A road was built to the town of Matlock by 1950, but it was not maintained and became unusable.

Apart from John Patrick Dwyer, the locality's most well-known inhabitant was Kitty Cane, a former dancer and mining investor who owned a successful roadside tavern. Legend has it that when Cane died, her loyal customers and the local miners decided to carry her coffin to the Aberfeldy cemetery. However, since Cane was unusually heavy, weighing 22 stone (140 kilos) and because the miners were intoxicated, the coffin never made it to the cemetery. Instead the miners buried her beside the road. When travelling from The Thomson Dam to Aberfeldy, Kitty Cane's grave is about a kilometre (0.6 miles) after the Cast Iron Point lookout and on the left hand side of the Walhalla-Woods Point Road, Thompson.

Today, there are several holiday homes which are occupied occasionally. Land was released for public sale in 1999. Remains of some of the former gold-rush era buildings are still visible.

== Climate ==
Aberfeldy features a cold oceanic climate (Cfb) due to its elevation at a deep southern latitude, nearing the 38th parallel south. By mean maximum temperature, it is the coldest locality in Victoria and likewise mainland Australia.

Aberfeldy is frequently coated in snow, receiving an average of 32.5 snowy days annually. Summer snow is not uncommon.

Climate data for Aberfeldy (1969–1974, rainfall 1891–1985); 1,060 m AMSL; 37.70° S, 146.37° E
Month	Jan	Feb	Mar	Apr	May	Jun	Jul	Aug	Sep	Oct	Nov	Dec	Year
Record high °C (°F)	32.0 (89.6)	28.9 (84.0)	26.5 (79.7)	21.7 (71.1)	18.3 (64.9)	15.0 (59.0)	12.0 (53.6)	15.6 (60.1)	19.5 (67.1)	21.1 (70.0)	23.9 (75.0)	30.0 (86.0)	32.0 (89.6)
Mean daily maximum °C (°F)	20.4 (68.7)	20.3 (68.5)	17.6 (63.7)	13.7 (56.7)	9.5 (49.1)	6.7 (44.1)	5.8 (42.4)	6.1 (43.0)	9.1 (48.4)	12.7 (54.9)	14.8 (58.6)	18.6 (65.5)	12.9 (55.3)
Mean daily minimum °C (°F)	9.4 (48.9)	10.2 (50.4)	8.1 (46.6)	6.3 (43.3)	3.5 (38.3)	1.1 (34.0)	0.4 (32.7)	0.3 (32.5)	1.7 (35.1)	4.0 (39.2)	5.3 (41.5)	7.8 (46.0)	4.8 (40.7)
Record low °C (°F)	0.6 (33.1)	2.8 (37.0)	0.0 (32.0)	−1.1 (30.0)	−1.7 (28.9)	−5.6 (21.9)	−5.6 (21.9)	−7.0 (19.4)	−5.0 (23.0)	−3.9 (25.0)	−1.1 (30.0)	0.0 (32.0)	−7.0 (19.4)
Average precipitation mm (inches)	68.0 (2.68)	62.7 (2.47)	71.5 (2.81)	84.1 (3.31)	101.8 (4.01)	98.5 (3.88)	95.7 (3.77)	116.7 (4.59)	104.4 (4.11)	109.4 (4.31)	90.3 (3.56)	79.4 (3.13)	1,083.5 (42.66)
Average precipitation days (≥ 0.2 mm)	7.4	6.4	8.2	10.0	12.2	13.3	14.3	15.2	13.4	13.0	10.6	8.9	132.9
Source: Australian Bureau of Meteorology; Aberfeldy
