= Maindample railway station =

Former railway station in Victoria, Australia

Coordinates: 37°01′45″S 145°56′15″E

Maindample

General information
- Line: Mansfield

Other information
- Status: Closed

History
- Opened: 7 May 1891
- Closed: 8 November 1978

Services
Preceding station	Disused railways	Following station
Bonnie Doon	Mansfield line	Mansfield
	List of closed railway stations in Victoria	
Location

Maindample is a former railway station in Maindample, Victoria, Australia. The tracks have been removed.
