= Bonnie Doon, Victoria =

Bonnie Doon
- Town
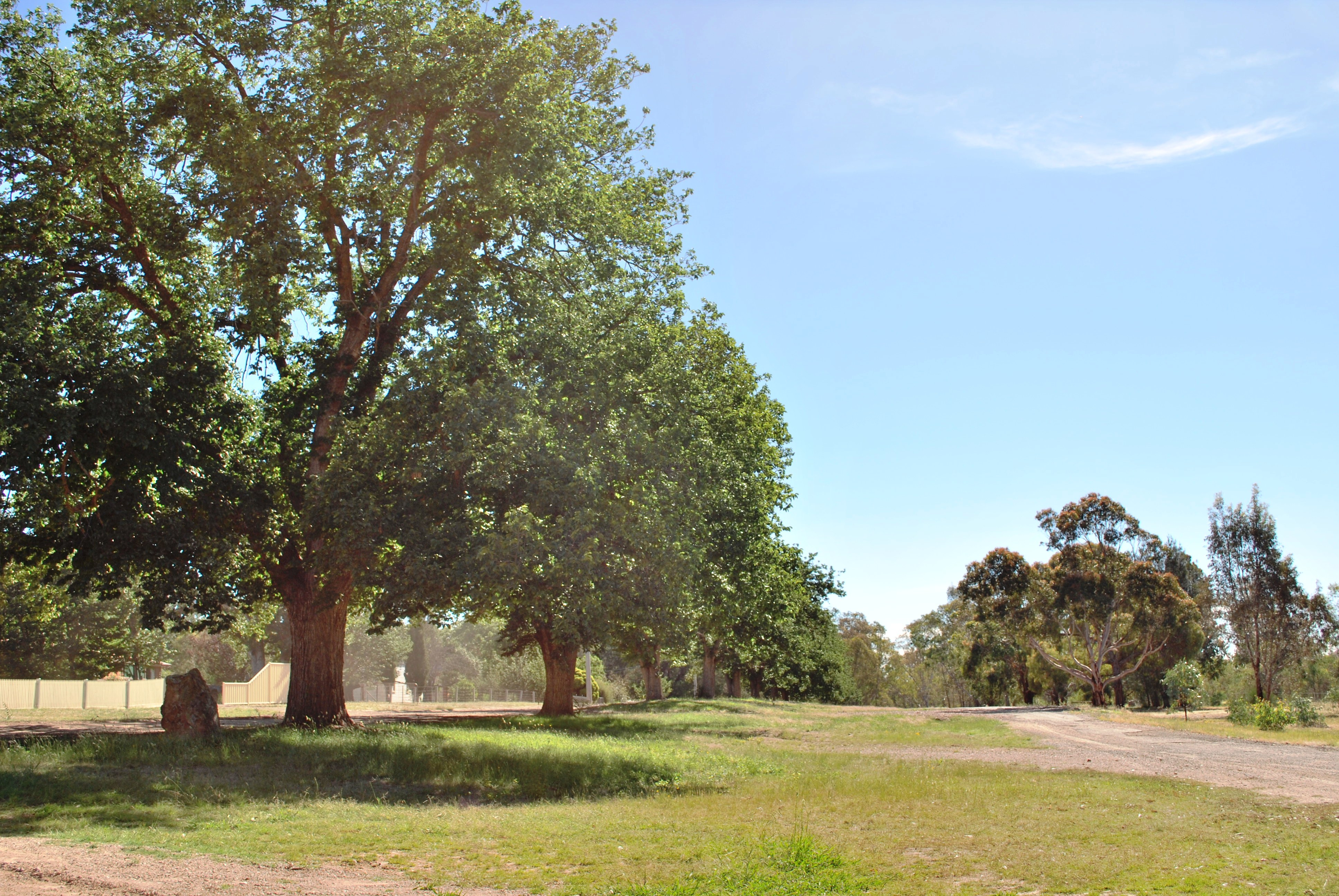

- Interactive map of Bonnie Doon
- Coordinates: 37°01′S 145°51′E
- Country: Australia
- State: Victoria
- Region: Hume
- LGA: Shire of Mansfield
- Location: 22 km (14 mi) W of Mansfield; 36 km (22 mi) NE of Alexandra; 40.5 km (25.2 mi) N of Eildon; 168 km (104 mi) NE of Melbourne

Government
  - State electorate: Eildon
  - Federal division: Indi

Population
  - Total: 666 (2021 census)
- Postcode: 3720
- Annual rainfall: 708.2 mm (27.88 in)

Bonnie Doon is a town in Victoria, Australia. It is located on the Maroondah Highway, in the Shire of Mansfield. Bonnie Doon is 168 kilometres north-east of Melbourne via the Melba Highway. At the 2021 census, Bonnie Doon had a population of 666.

== History ==
Bonnie Doon was established subsequent to gold discoveries in the area. It was originally named Doon after the town of that name in Ireland. The Post Office opened on 1 October 1866 and was renamed Bonnie Doon in 1891 coinciding with the arrival of the railway.

Much of the original town of Bonnie Doon was flooded by the construction of Lake Eildon in the 1950s. The town was relocated; some buildings were picked up and moved, whilst others were able to remain in their original site, such as the churches.

== Tourism ==
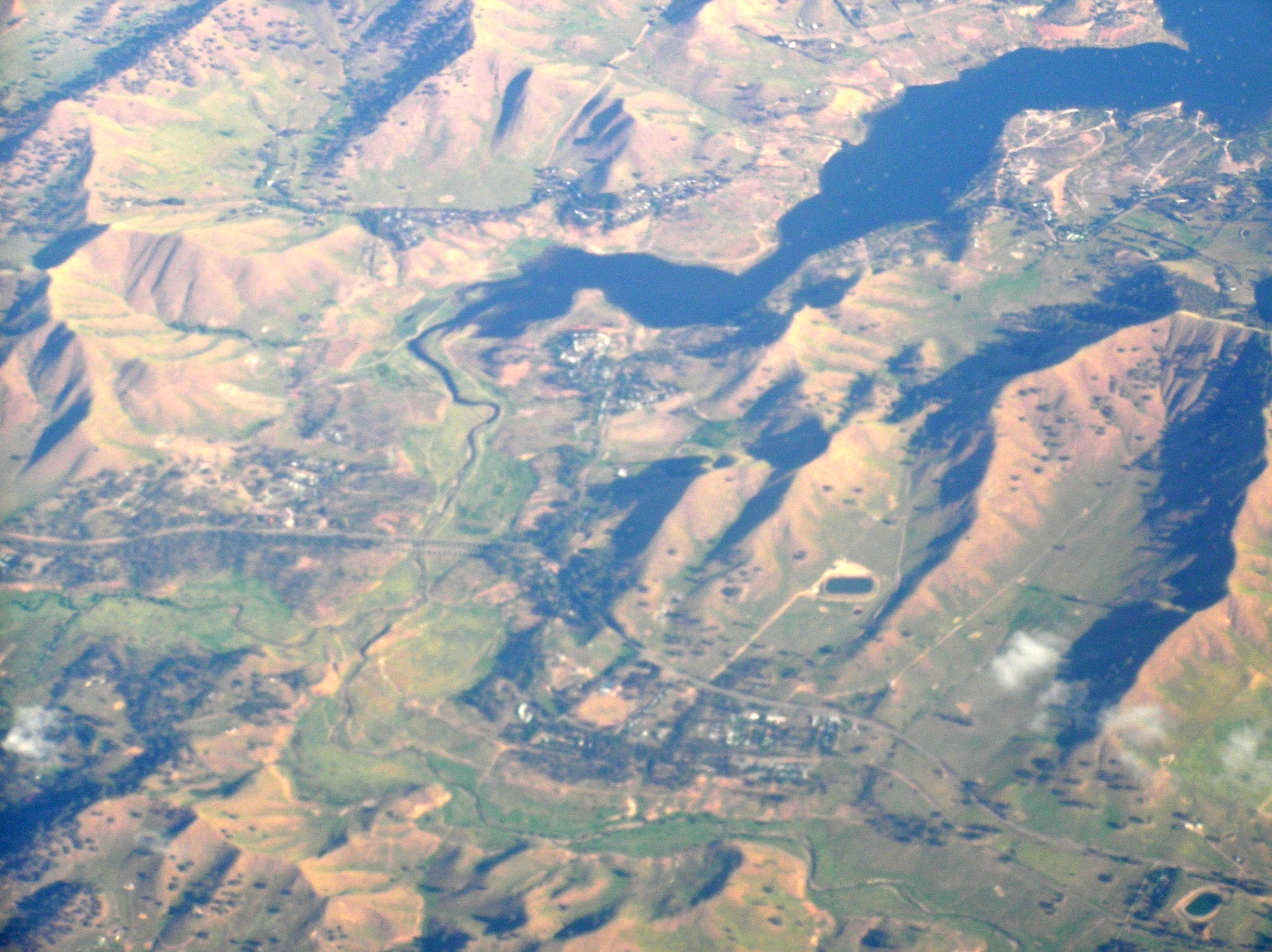
Aerial photo of Bonnie Doon

Lake Eildon makes Bonnie Doon a minor tourist town for water activities, and the surrounds of Bonnie Doon, which has a rail trail, are somewhat popular for weekend holidaymakers. This popularity was satirised in the Australian comedy, The Castle, with popular quotes such as "How's the serenity?" and its catch-phrase song "We're going to Bonnie Doon".

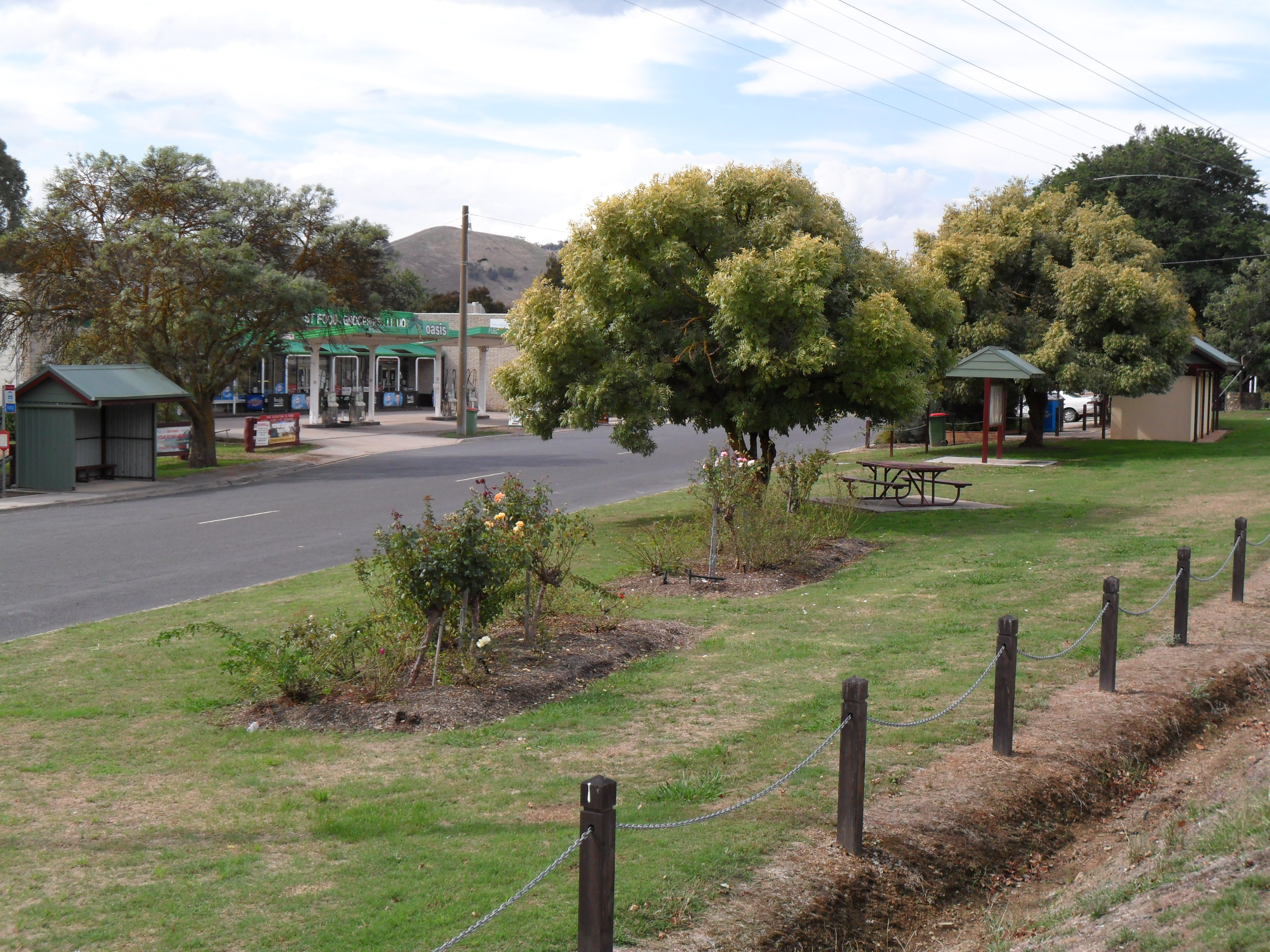
Bon Crescent, Bonnie Doon

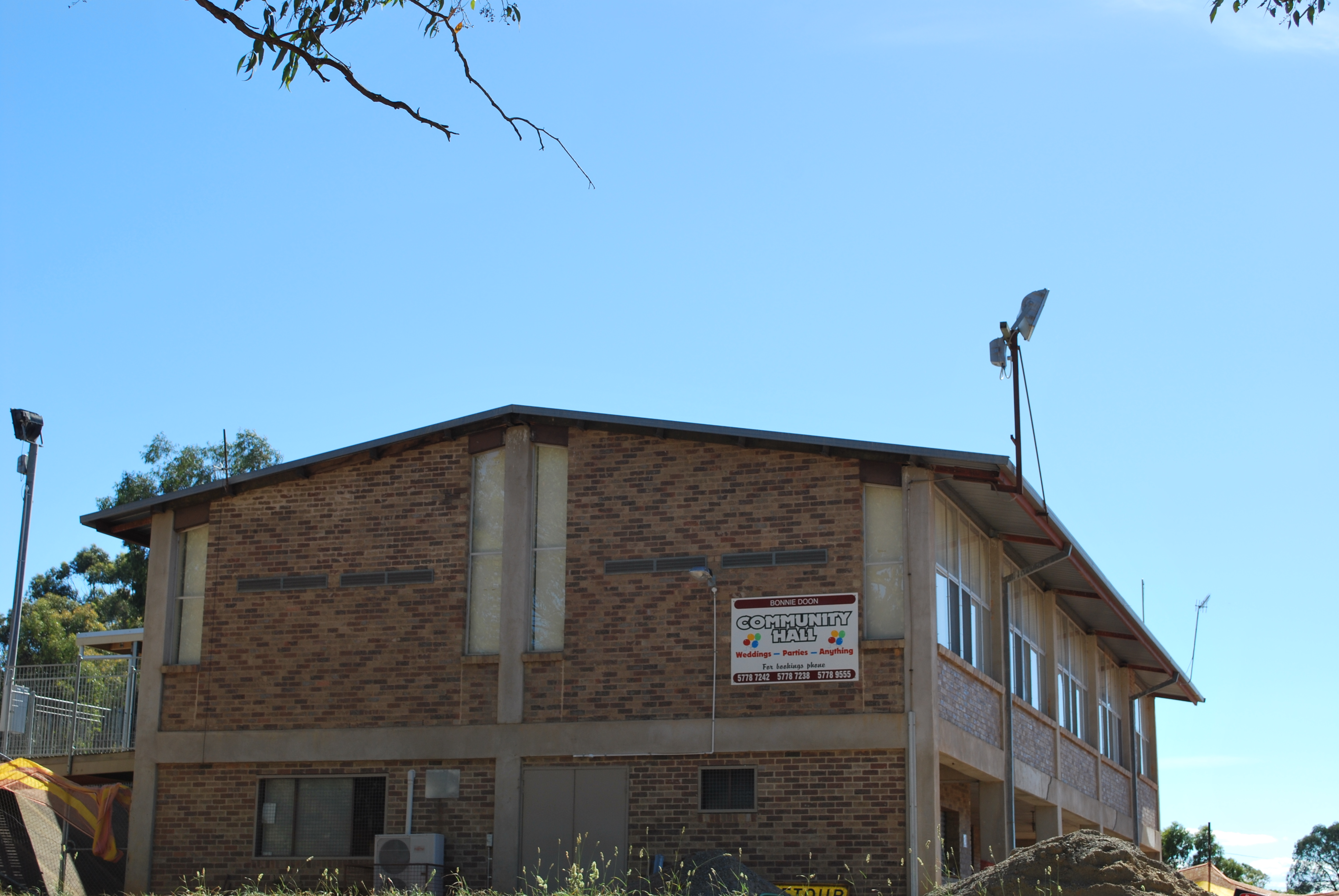
Bonnie Doon FNC Clubrooms

== Sport and recreation ==
The Bonnie Doon Football Club was established in 1885 and they initially played in the Mansfield District Football Association in 1901 and won the 1901 premiership.

Bonnie Doon FC won six football premierships between 1900 and 1952 in a number of different football associations.

Bonnie Doon FC played in the Waranga North East Football Association from 1953 to 1964 and played in nine consecutive grand finals between 1956 and 1964, winning five premierships.

Bonnie Doon FNC then played in the Benalla & District Football League between 1965 and 2009, winning seven senior football premierships and were also runner up fifteen times during this period.

As of 2010, Bonnie Doon FNC have played in the Ovens & King Football League fielding senior and reserves football teams, plus A, B, B Reserve, C Grade and Under 15 netball teams.

== Lake Eildon ==
The Eildon Dam is a rock and earth-fill embankment dam with a controlled spillway, located on the Goulburn River between the regional towns of Mansfield and Eildon within Lake Eildon National Park, in the Alpine region of Victoria, Australia. The dam's purpose is for the supply of potable water, irrigation, and the generation of hydroelectricity. The impounded reservoir is called Lake Eildon. The first cut of ground was done by Mr Bain and Mr MacLean from Scotland.

Bonnie Doon is one of the main access points for visitors to Lake Eildon.

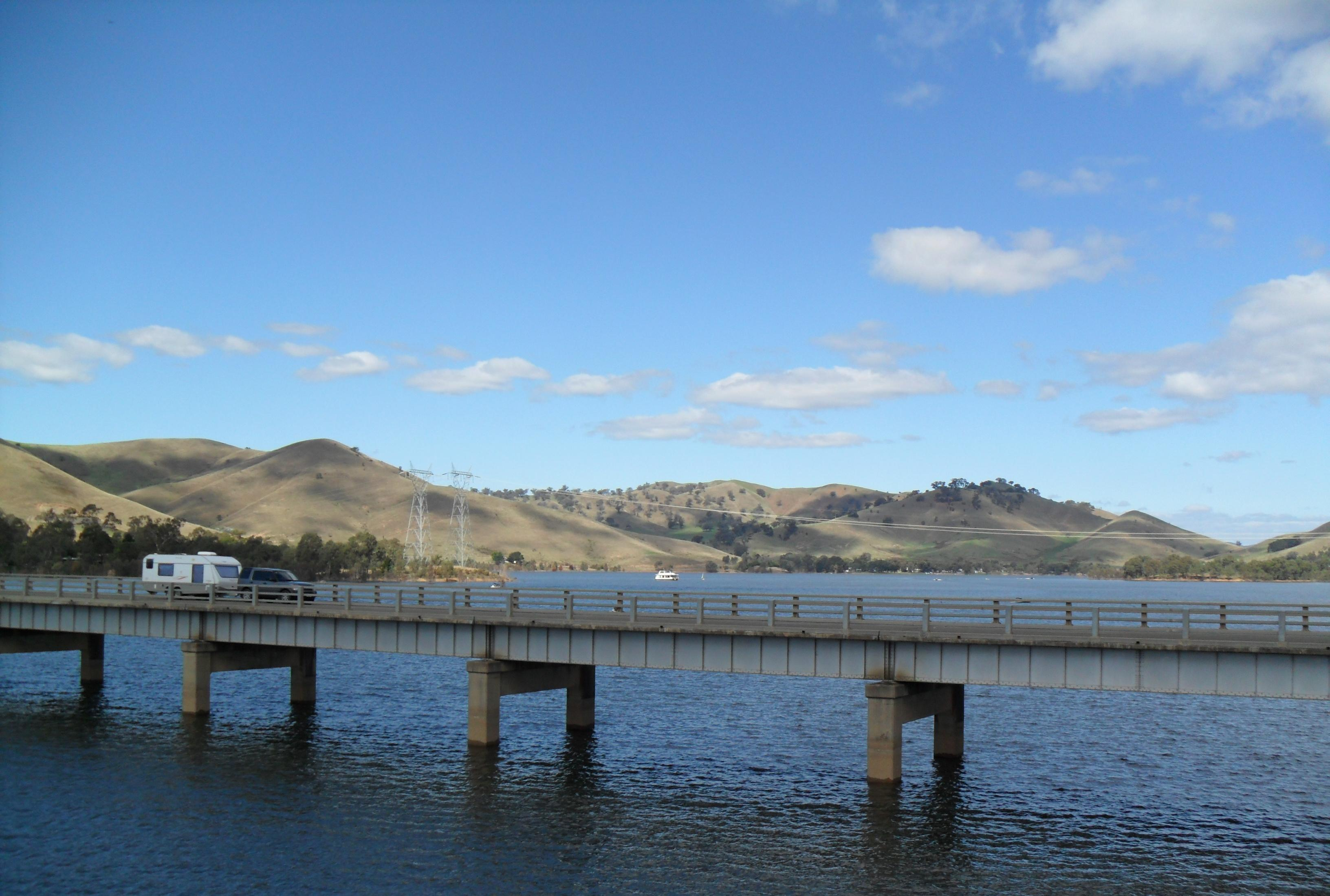
Lake Eildon & bridge, Bonnie Doon

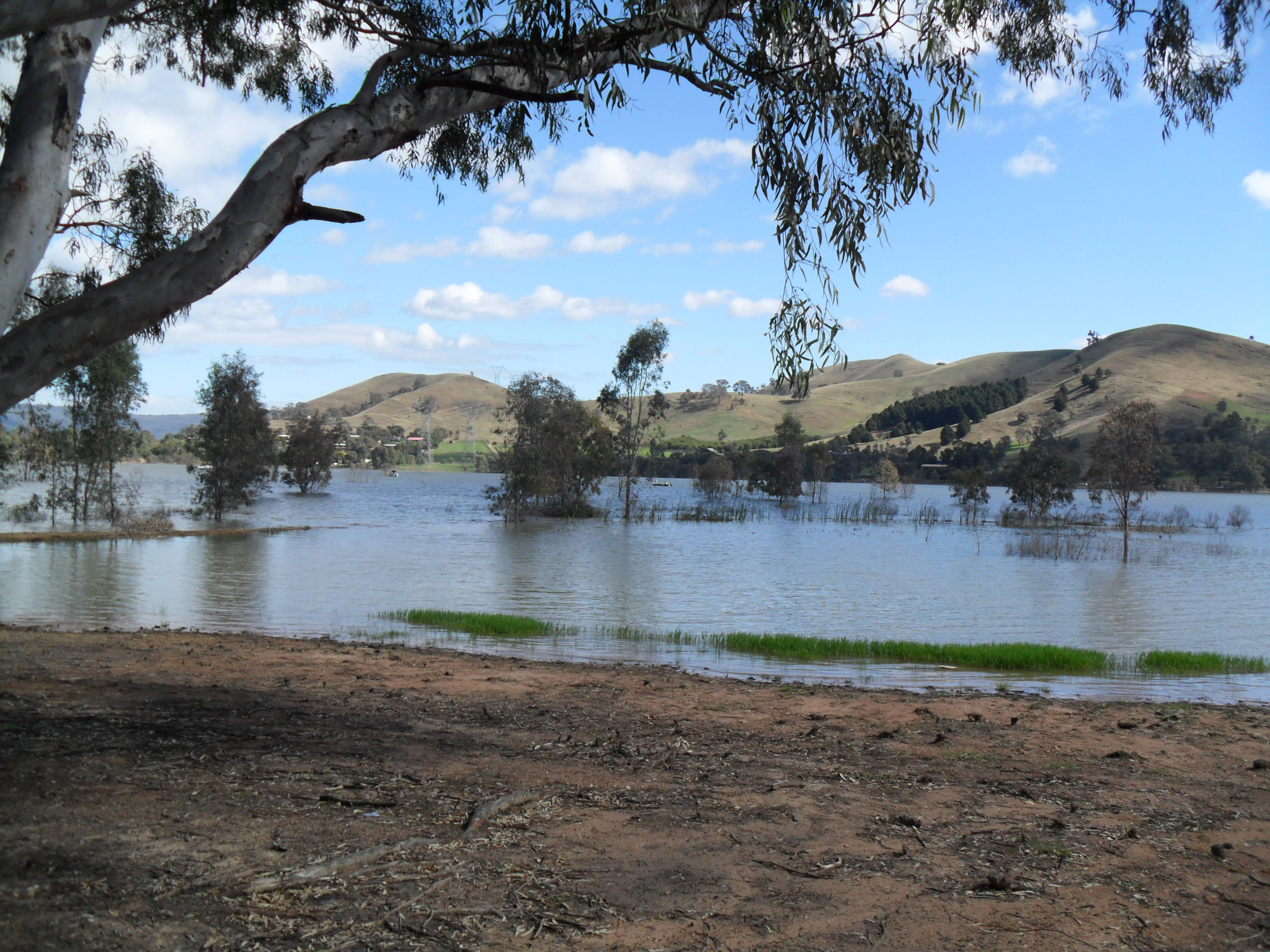
Lake Eildon near Maroondah Hwy.
