= Mansfield, Victoria =

Mansfield
- Town
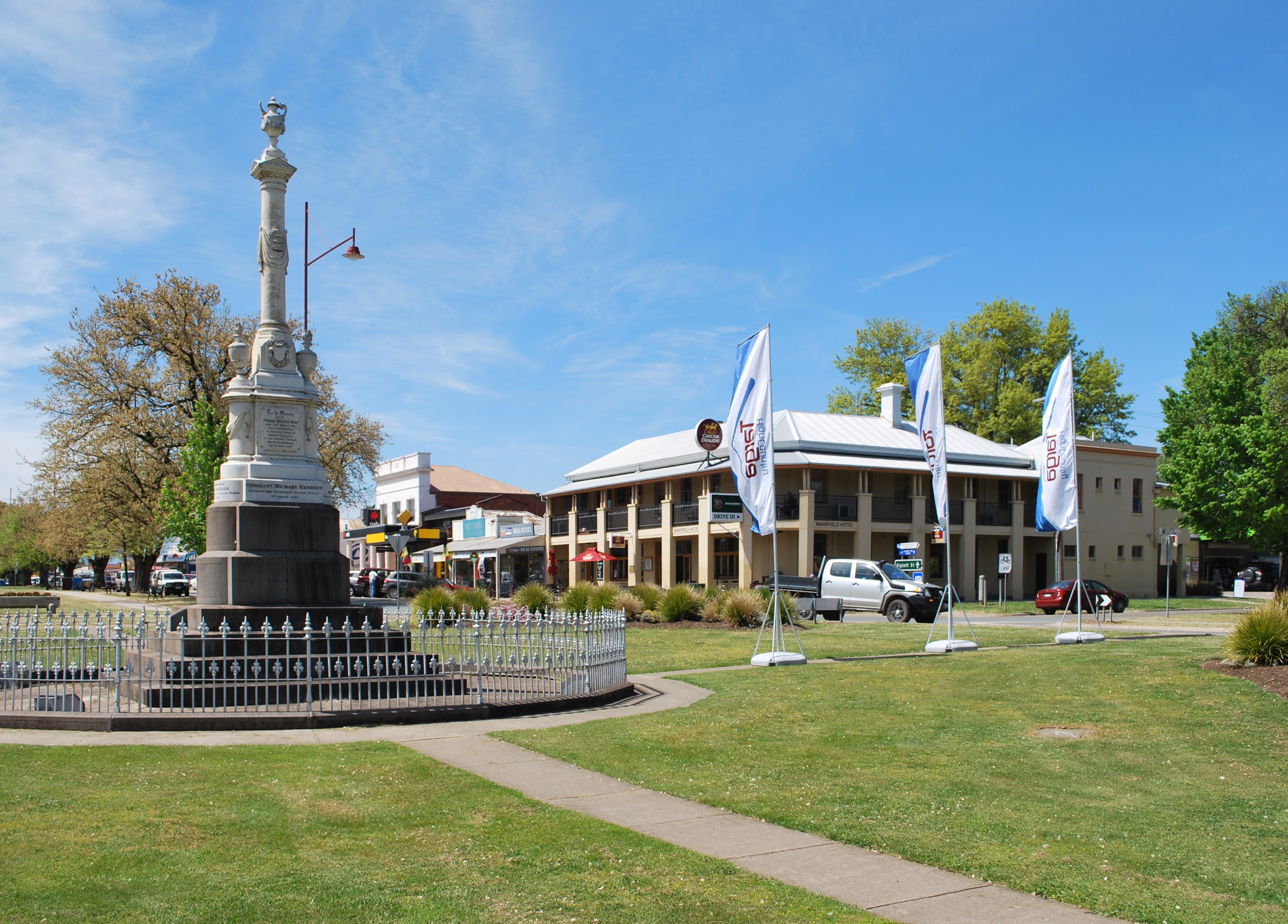
- Police memorial with the Mansfield Hotel in the background

- Interactive map of Mansfield
- Coordinates: 37°03′0″S 146°05′0″E
- Country: Australia
- State: Victoria
- Region: Hume
- LGA: Shire of Mansfield
- Location: 202 km (126 mi) NE of Melbourne; 65 km (40 mi) S of Benalla; 117 km (73 mi) E of Seymour

Government
  - State electorate: Eildon
  - Federal division: Indi
- Elevation: 316 m (1,037 ft)

Population
  - Total: 5,541 (2021 census)
- Postcode: 3722
- Mean max temp: 20.9 °C (69.6 °F)
- Mean min temp: 5.1 °C (41.2 °F)
- Annual rainfall: 719.4 mm (28.32 in)

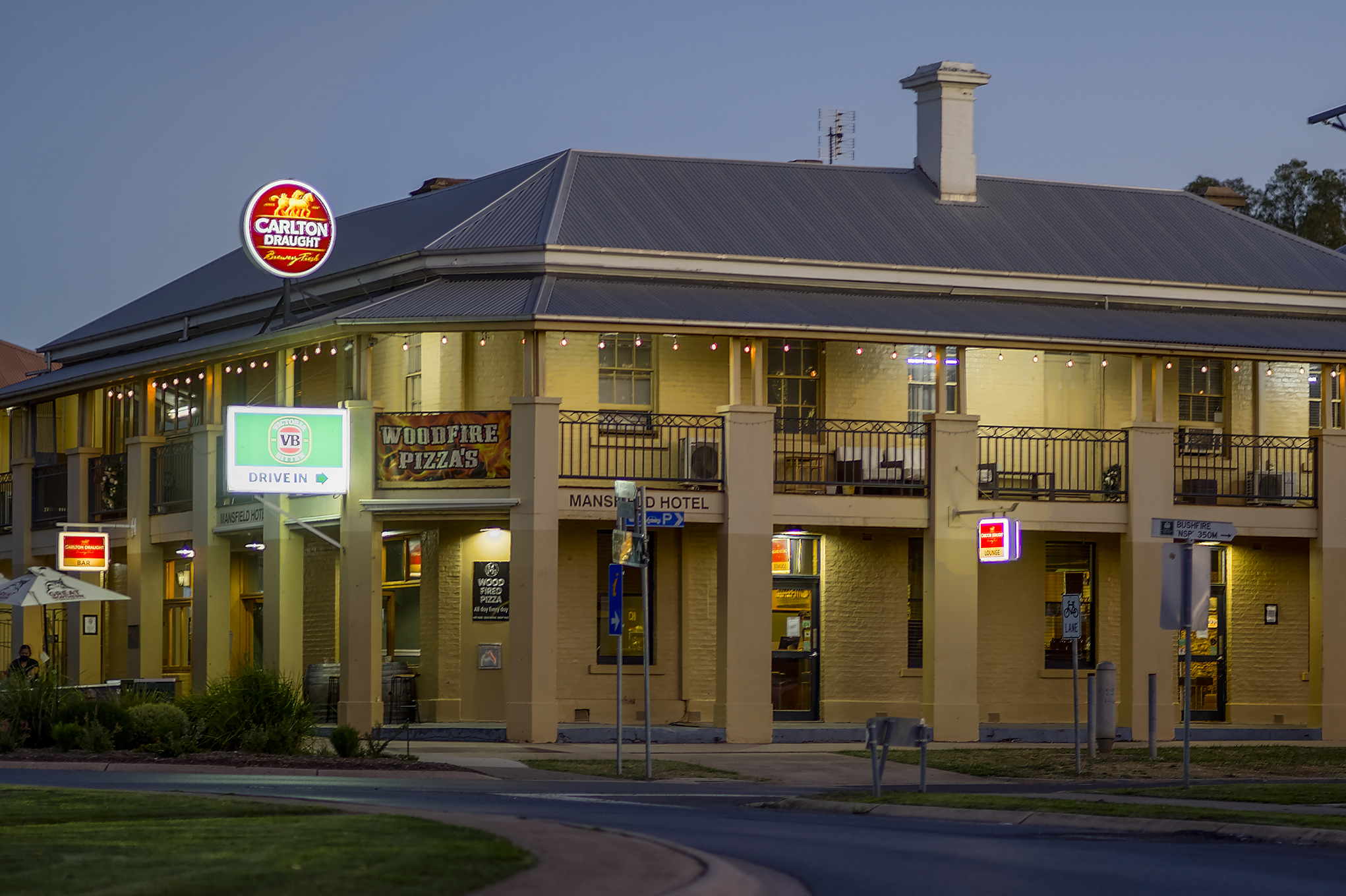
The Mansfield Hotel 2021

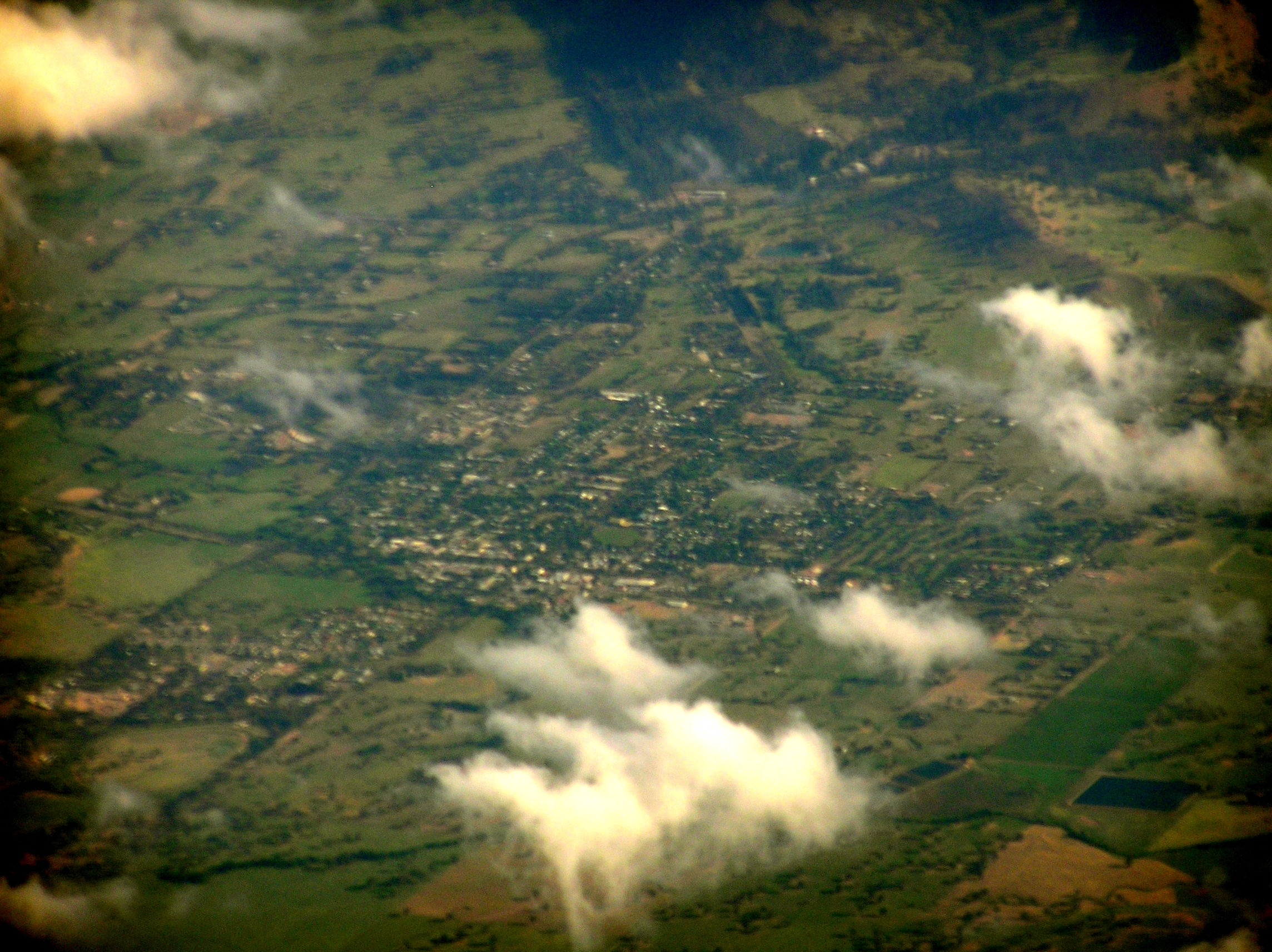
Aerial view of Mansfield.

Mansfield is a town in the foothills of the Victorian Alps in the Australian state of Victoria. It is approximately 180 kilometres (110 mi) north-east of Melbourne by road. The population of Mansfield was 5,541 at the 2021 census.

Mansfield is the seat of the Mansfield local government area. Mansfield was formerly heavily dependent on farming and logging but is now a tourist centre. It is the support town for the large Australia ski resort Mount Buller. It is associated with the high-country tradition of alpine grazing, celebrated in the film made around Mansfield, near the now famous Craigs Hut, called The Man from Snowy River (based on a poem by Banjo Paterson).

== History ==
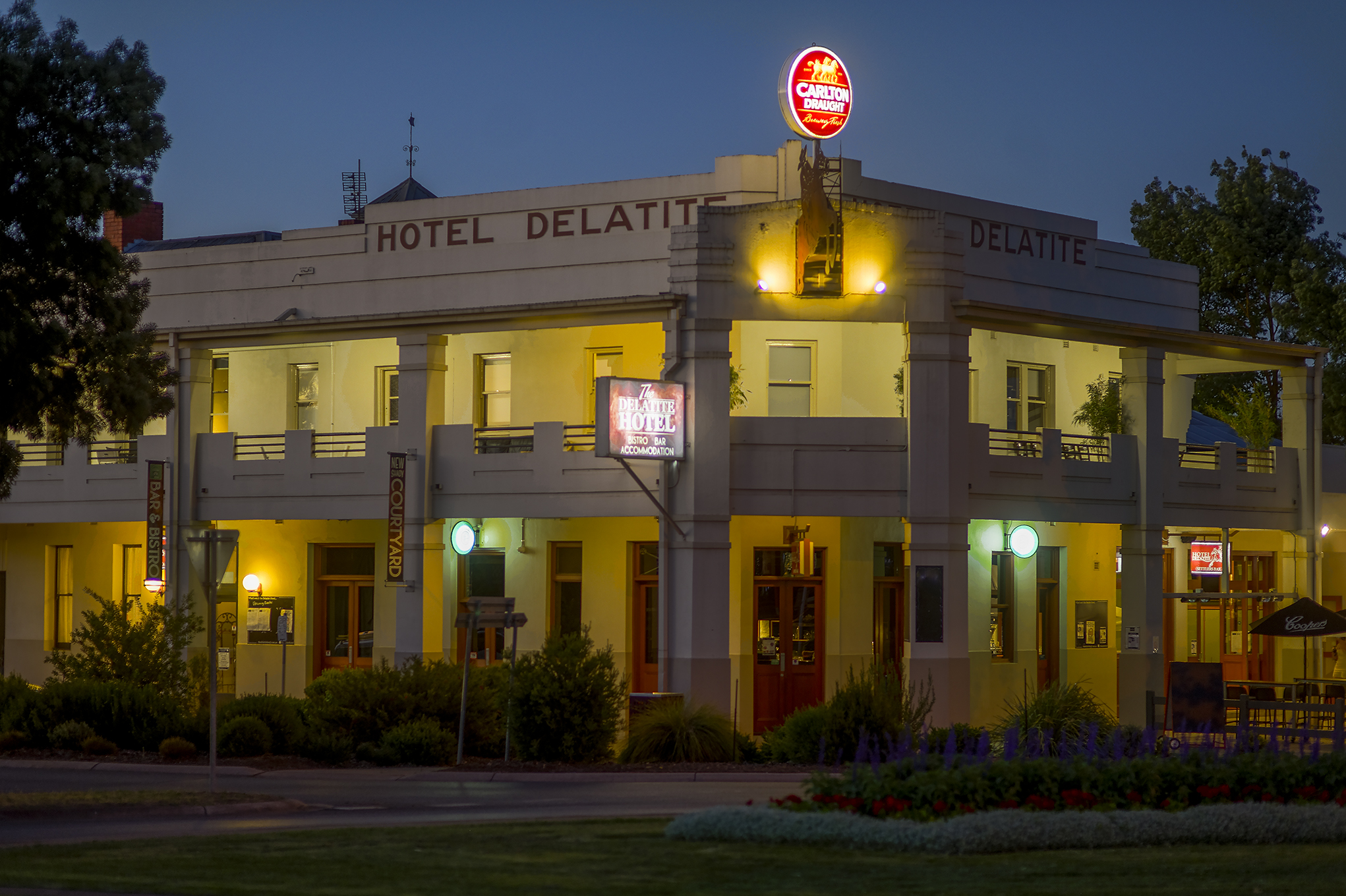
The Delatite Hotel Mansfield 2021

The traditional owners of the Mansfield region are the Yowengillum clan of the Taungurung people. They also inhabited Alexandra and the Upper Goulburn River.

British colonisers began to enter the region in 1839 when Andrew Ewing (sometimes referred to as Andrew Ewan), a stockman representing the Scottish livestock company Watson & Hunter, scouted the area for a new sheep station. Ewing encountered Yowengillum people along a waterway he named Devils River, as he considered these people to be "black devils". The best land was to be found east of this river, adjacent to Mount Battery (known as Bayerlite to the Yowengillum), and Ewing established the Mount Battery sheep station there in 1840. The overseer's hut was built near where the town of Mansfield now stands. Aboriginal encampments were also located near Mount Battery and were noted for their large stone ovens. Bitteruc, a Yowengillum elder at this time, stated that the land around Bayerlite was "good country, my country."

Mansfield, originally known as Mount Battery, became a township that was surveyed in 1851 and named after Mansfield in Nottinghamshire, England. Settlement came after the discovery of gold nearby and the Post Office opened on 1 January 1858.

On the 11 November 1863, a triple hanging occurred in Melbourne Gaol; Elizabeth Scott, along with Julian Cross and David Gedge, were executed for the murder of Elizabeth's husband in the Wappan district (near Mansfield).

Mansfield is famous as part of the Ned Kelly Trail. Significant memorials include the Memorial to Police erected in the centre of the town's roundabout. Mansfield Cemetery is the burial ground for police officers slain by Ned Kelly and his gang at Stringybark Creek.

Dr. John Pearson Rowe (1810–1878) was a physician and squatter who owned the 'Loyola Run' (also known as Mount Battery) near Mansfield. Reputed as the first Roman Catholic resident of the district, it is recorded that nearby Rochester was named after J. P. Rowe, as he owned land on the Campaspe River. Rowe was a principal founder of the University of Melbourne. He fired a shot at a 14-year-old Ned Kelly accompanied by bushranger Harry Power in 1869. Rowe stood for the Upper House seat of the Murray District in 1859 and was defeated. In October 1878 Rowe supplied information to police Sergeant Kennedy on the whereabouts of Ned Kelly. Acting on Rowe's verified advice, Kennedy and his police party rode into the Wombat Ranges, where three of them were killed; and the Kelly Gang legend was born.

By 1878, the town had half a dozen general stores, several butchers, and blacksmiths. Public buildings included the shire hall and library, a hospital, three churches, and Victoria Hall (where concerts were held).

The railway to Mansfield arrived in the town from Tallarook in 1891, being closed on 18 November 1978. The last passenger service was on 28 May 1977. The former Mansfield station building near High Street now serves tourists to the community as a visitor centre.

Around 9:15am on 22 September 2021, Geoscience Australia detected a magnitude-5.9 earthquake centred at Licola, around 130km from Mansfield at a depth of 10km.

== Literature ==
The area round Mansfield named as Banbury was also the location of the novel The Far Country by Nevil Shute which featured logging on Mount Buller and previous forest fires, which having swept through Howqua obliterated almost all traces of a former settlement.

== Recreation ==
Mansfield is very close to two large lakes, Lake Eildon and Lake Nillahcootie. During the summer these sites are popular waterskiing destinations.

The nearby Mount Buller and Mount Stirling offer attractions all year round. During winter they are visited for skiing, lifted and back country respectively. In the summer hiking and mountain biking are popular. Ski lifts operate year-round at Mount Buller allowing bikers to easily get to the top of downhill mountain biking runs.

The bushland around Mansfield is used for horse riding, trail biking and four wheel driving on extensive tracks throughout the region.

In past years, the "Mansfield Balloon Festival" celebrated hot air balloons, and drew crowds and enthusiasts from across the state. The balloon Festival hasn't been to Mansfield for several years.

Mansfield is also the home to the Mansfield Eagles football club, an Australian Rules team competing in the Goulburn Valley Football League.

Mansfield has a horse racing club, the Mansfield District Racing Club, which schedules two race meetings a year, including the Mansfield Cup meeting on 27 December).

Golfers play at the Mansfield golf course on Kidston Parade.

Mansfield is at one end of the Great Victorian Rail Trail, which officially opened in 2012. The rail trail is the second longest in Australia, and is used by push bike riders, horse riders, and walkers.

== Climate ==
Mansfield has an oceanic climate (Cfb), with warm and relatively dry summers and cool rainy winters. Diurnal range is extraordinary, due to the very cold mornings in summer brought about by frequent cold front activity.

Climate data for Mansfield 2 (1883–1956); 315 m AMSL; 37.05° S, 146.08° E
Month	Jan	Feb	Mar	Apr	May	Jun	Jul	Aug	Sep	Oct	Nov	Dec	Year
Mean daily maximum °C (°F)	29.6 (85.3)	29.4 (84.9)	26.0 (78.8)	21.1 (70.0)	15.9 (60.6)	12.6 (54.7)	11.5 (52.7)	13.5 (56.3)	17.4 (63.3)	20.9 (69.6)	24.7 (76.5)	27.9 (82.2)	20.9 (69.6)
Mean daily minimum °C (°F)	10.2 (50.4)	9.8 (49.6)	7.8 (46.0)	4.6 (40.3)	2.1 (35.8)	2.0 (35.6)	0.2 (32.4)	1.7 (35.1)	2.9 (37.2)	4.6 (40.3)	6.4 (43.5)	8.6 (47.5)	5.1 (41.1)
Average precipitation mm (inches)	44.7 (1.76)	39.1 (1.54)	56.2 (2.21)	50.8 (2.00)	60.8 (2.39)	75.7 (2.98)	66.7 (2.63)	73.7 (2.90)	69.0 (2.72)	75.9 (2.99)	59.2 (2.33)	47.3 (1.86)	719.4 (28.32)
Average precipitation days (≥ 0.2 mm)	5.6	5.2	6.0	7.7	11.1	13.9	15.7	15.2	12.8	11.3	8.5	6.6	119.6
Source: Australian Bureau of Meteorology; Mansfield 2

== Notable residents ==
- Liam Bradley – Composer, musician, radiographer
- Elizabeth Vivienne Conabere – botanical artist, writer and conservationist
- James Cousins – current football player in the Australian Football League
- Josh Fraser – ex-Collingwood and Gold Coast Suns football player in the AFL
- Max Fricke – Motorcycle speedway rider. 2013, 2014, 2015 and 2017 Australian Under-21 Champion and 2016 World Under-21 Champion
- Simon Gerrans – road bicycle racer
- Jack Hutchins – ex-Gold Coast Suns football player in the Australian Football League
- Lex Lasry – lawyer and a retired judge of the Supreme Court of Victoria
- David Mensch – former football player at the Geelong Football Club
- Victoria Mitchell – long-distance runner
- Catherine Skinner – shooter (women's trap)
- Cyril Henry Thomas Towers – rugby union player
- Alex "Chumpy" Pullin – 2011 and 2013 border cross (snowboard) world champion
- Hayley Wilson – skateboarder at the 2020 Summer Olympics
