= Mokoan Dam =

Former dam, now wetlands, in Victoria, Australia

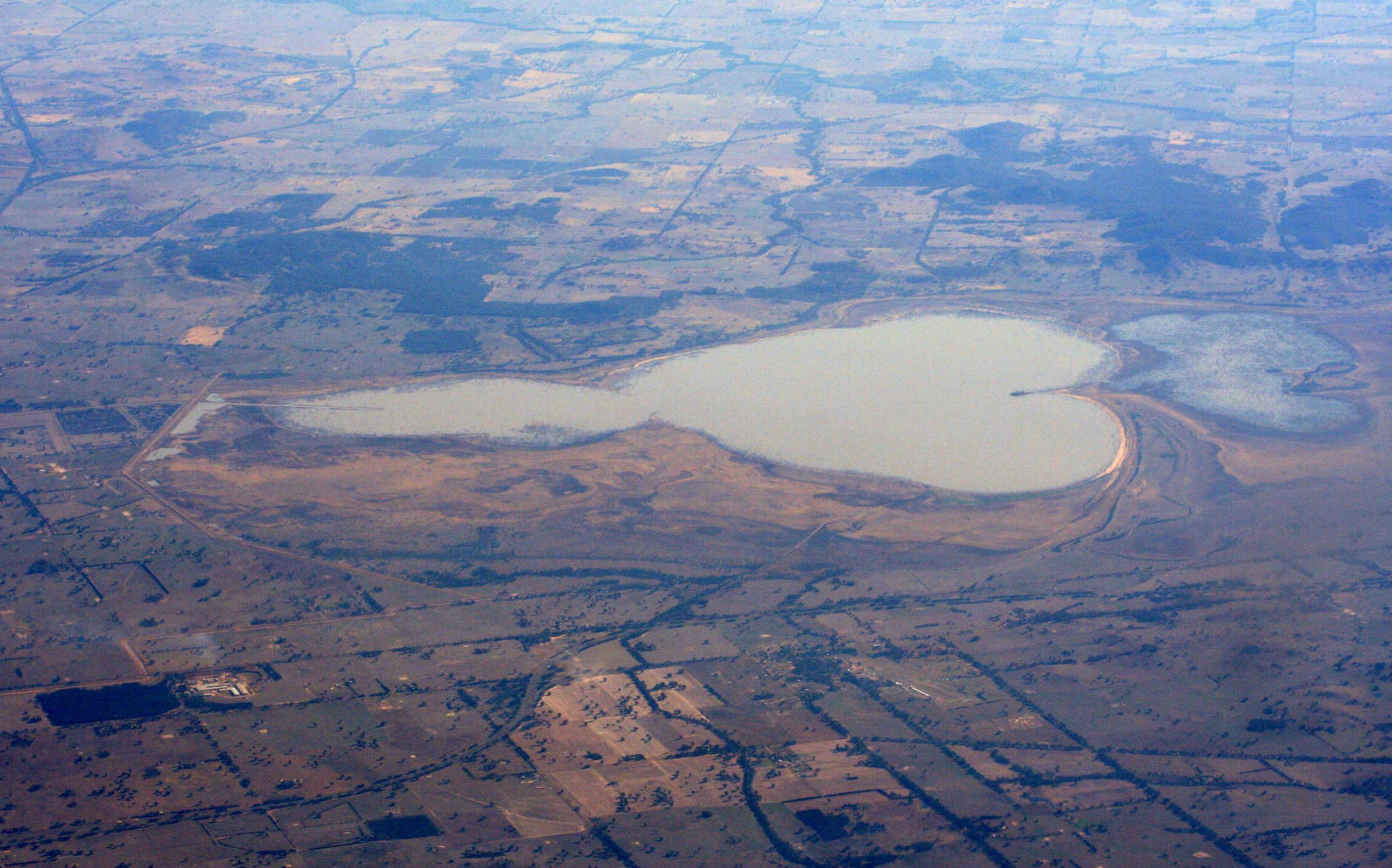
- Aerial view of the reservoir in 2008, prior to its decommissioning in 2011

- Location of the former dam in Victoria
- Country: Australia
- Location: near Benalla, Victoria
- Coordinates: 36°28′52″S 146°01′14″E
- Purpose: Water supply; Irrigation
- Status: Decommissioned
- Construction began: 1960s
- Opening date: 1971
- Demolition date: 2011 (decommissioned)
- Operator: Goulburn–Murray Water (as a dam)

Dam and spillways
- Type of dam: Earth fill dam
- Impounds: Winton Swamp; off-stream
- Height (foundation): 11 m (36 ft)
- Length: 7,500 m (24,600 ft)
- Dam volume: 956×10^{3} m^{3} (33.8×10^{6} cu ft)
- Spillway type: Uncontrolled
- Spillway capacity: 255 m^{3}/s (9,000 cu ft/s)
- Lake Mokoan (former)
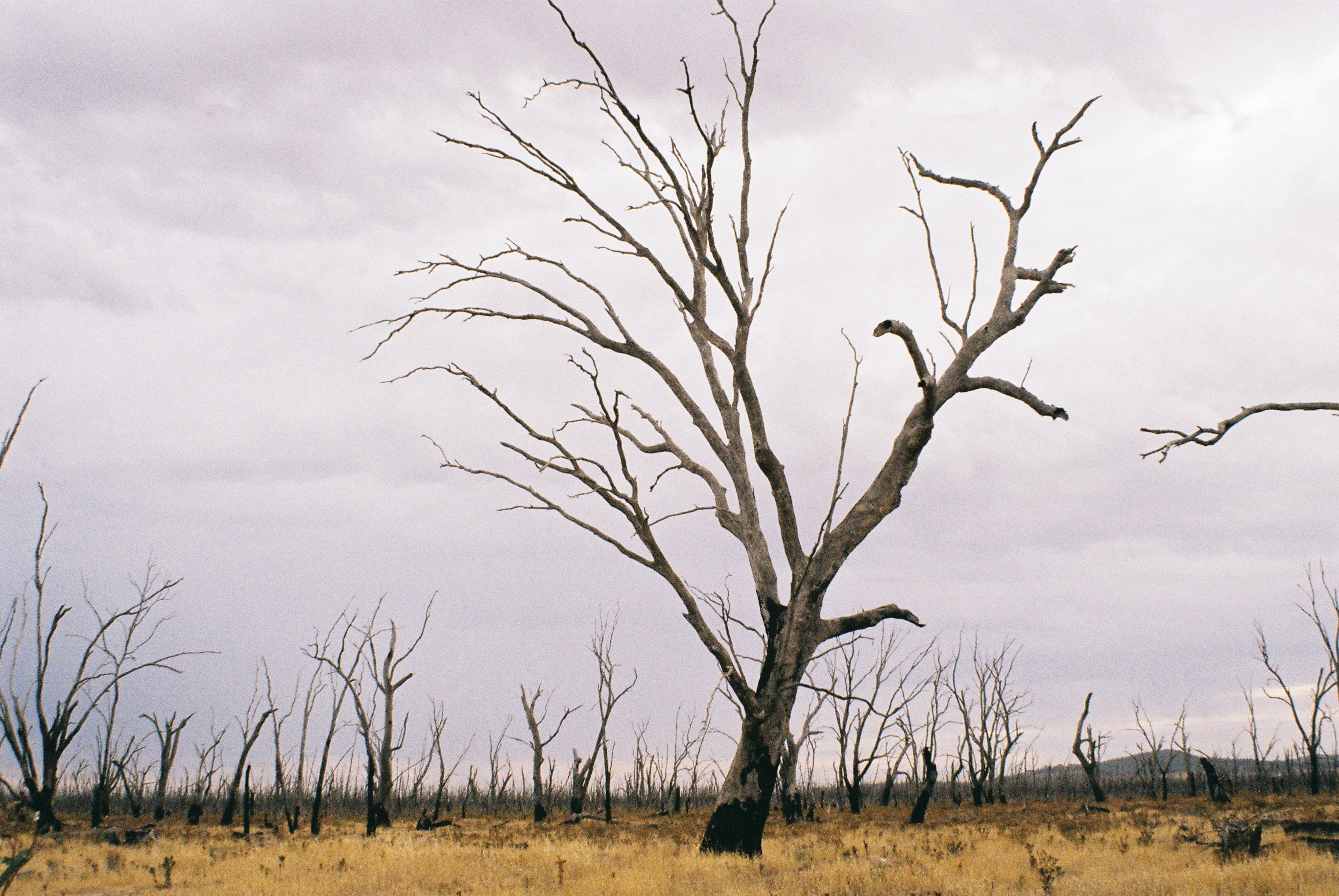
- Dead Murray River Red Gums in the wetlands, 2021
- Interactive map of Winton Wetlands
- Location: Northern Victoria
- Coordinates: 36°30′22″S 146°5′46″E
- Type: Wetlands
- Primary inflows: Seven Mile Creek; Winton Creek; Eleven Mile Creek; Show Creek; Taminick Creek; Mokoan Inlet Channel (catchment flooding)
- Primary outflows: Evaporation; Broken Creek (catchment flooding)
- Catchment area: 339 km^{2} (131 sq mi)
- Surface area: 9,000 ha (22,000 acres) (wetlands site); 789.1 ha (1,950 acres) (as a reservoir) (Note: Although, flooded area is believed to total 3,000 ha (7,400 acres).)
- Max. depth: 7.3 m (24 ft)
- Water volume: 365 GL (296,000 acre⋅ft) (as a reservoir)
- Surface elevation: 165 m (541 ft) AHD
- Website: wintonwetlands.org.au

The Mokoan Dam is a decommissioned earth-filled embankment dam across Winton Swamp, located approximately 7 kilometres (4.3 mi) north-east of Benalla, in northern Victoria, Australia. Completed in 1971, the resultant reservoir, Lake Mokoan, was also fed through off-stream storage by water diverted from the Broken River and Hollands Creek into the Winton and Green swamps – a former wetlands system. Operated by Goulburn–Murray Water, the dam was a source of supply of potable water and irrigation.

Ongoing environmental issues – including algal blooms, significant water loss from evaporation, costs of operating the reservoir as a water supply, and dam safety upgrade costs – caused frequent interruptions to supply due to, in part, not completing the intended works downstream of the reservoir making the reservoir inefficient. In 2004, the Victorian Government decided to decommission the dam and transform the former Lake Mokoan into the Winton Wetlands. Decommissioning work was completed between 2009 and 2011, with estimates that the new wetlands may take between 30–40 years, or up to 100 years to return to its natural conditions.

== Dam and reservoir overview ==
=== Dam ===
Located on the traditional lands of the Yorta Yorta people, construction of the former dam began in the late 1960s and was completed in 1971. The former earth-filled dam wall was 11 metres (36 ft) high and 7,500 metres (24,600 ft) long. When full, Lake Mokoan had a storage capacity of 365 gigalitres (296,000 acre⋅ft) and covered 789.1 hectares (1,950 acres), drawn from a catchment area of 339 square kilometres (131 sq mi). The uncontrolled spillway, prior to its decommissioning, had a discharge capacity of 255 cubic metres per second (9,000 cu ft/s).

=== Reservoir ===
Following its flooding, approximately 150,000 to 200,000 Murray River Red Gums within the former swamplands and surrounding plains soon died. The large and shallow 7.3-metre-deep (24 ft) lake had a very high surface area to volume ratio, resulting in extreme water loss through evaporation, and there were frequent toxic algal blooms that required regular closures for recreation activities and caused livestock to become ill and die.

It was initially planned that the East-Goulburn Channel, in conjunction with water supplied from the 40.4-gigalitre (32,800 acre⋅ft) Lake Nillahcootie collect water during winter and high rainfall events for diversion into Lake Mokoan. The East-Goulburn Channel was never completed. Additionally, minor flooding problems limited the effectiveness of this strategy. The Eastern Australian drought caused Lake Mokoan to completely drain in 1983, cessation of flood mitigation strategies in 1992, major flooding in the area in 1993, and political pressure to return environmental flows to the Snowy River were cited as reasons to evaluate the future of the reservoir.

== Decommissioning of the dam and reservoir ==
Although a locally popular recreational destination, after intensive studies, in 2004 the Victorian Government decided to decommission the dam, canals, and reserve to restore the landscape to a natural wetland and woodland ecosystem. Planning for the decommissioning began in 2004 and work started in 2009. The restoration effort was expected to take between 30–40 years, or up to 100 years.

Decommissioning the lake was expected to allow the rebalancing of 44 gigalitres (36,000 acre⋅ft) per year to the Broken, Goulburn, Snowy, and Murray rivers and irrigation network, with environmental and economic benefits to both upstream and downstream areas. Instead of evaporating, the saved water would be redirected or pumped overland from the upstream Lake Nillahcootie and Lake Eildon. It was claimed that 30 gigalitres (24,000 acre⋅ft) of the former lake would be released into the Murray River system, and another 20 to 21 gigalitres (16,000 to 17,000 acre⋅ft) released into the Snowy River. Completed by Goulburn-Murray Water, the decommissioning involved a 10-metre-wide (33 ft) breech in the embankment, as well as the dismantling and infill of various channels.

== Winton Wetlands ==
In 2010, the former Lake Mokoan, covering 3,000 hectares (7,400 acres) was reformed into ephemeral wetlands and the area, totalling 9,000 hectares (22,000 acres), classified as the Winton Wetlands Reserve. It is the largest wetlands restoration project in the Southern Hemisphere and, in 2013, it became the first site outside the United States to be classed as a Wetland of Distinction by the Society of Wetland Scientists, and the only site in Australia. The wetlands contains 180 native species of birds, fish, frogs, reptiles, bats and plants; and nearly 30 species that are listed as endangered or at risk.

The Victorian Government initially committed $1 million to assist with the restoration of the wetlands; subsequently increased to $17 million. Managed by a local management committee, restoration of the landscape and development of tourism commenced, with a visitor's centre and cafe, interpretive information signs, four campgrounds, picnic areas, public toilet blocks, 60 kilometres (37 mi) of roads, bush walks, 30 kilometres (19 mi) of cycling trails, and artworks celebrating the landscape and its history. Camping, boating, and fishing facilities were made accessible.

As of 2023, environmental restoration averaged 200 hectares (490 acres) per year, and plants regenerating and wildlife populations were increasing on the site. However, in July 2025 it was reported that the management committee was unable to establish a sustainable business model for the wetlands, and parts of the site were closed to the public.

== See also ==
- List of lakes of Victoria
- List of reservoirs and dams in Victoria
- A Directory of Important Wetlands in Australia
