= Jack Cleary =

Jack Cleary may refer to:

- Jack Cleary (footballer, born 1911), Australian rules footballer for Fitzroy
- Jack Cleary (footballer, born 1922), Australian rules footballer for Hawthorn
- Jack Cleary (rower), Australian rower

== See also ==
- John Cleary (disambiguation)
