= Benalla Art Gallery =

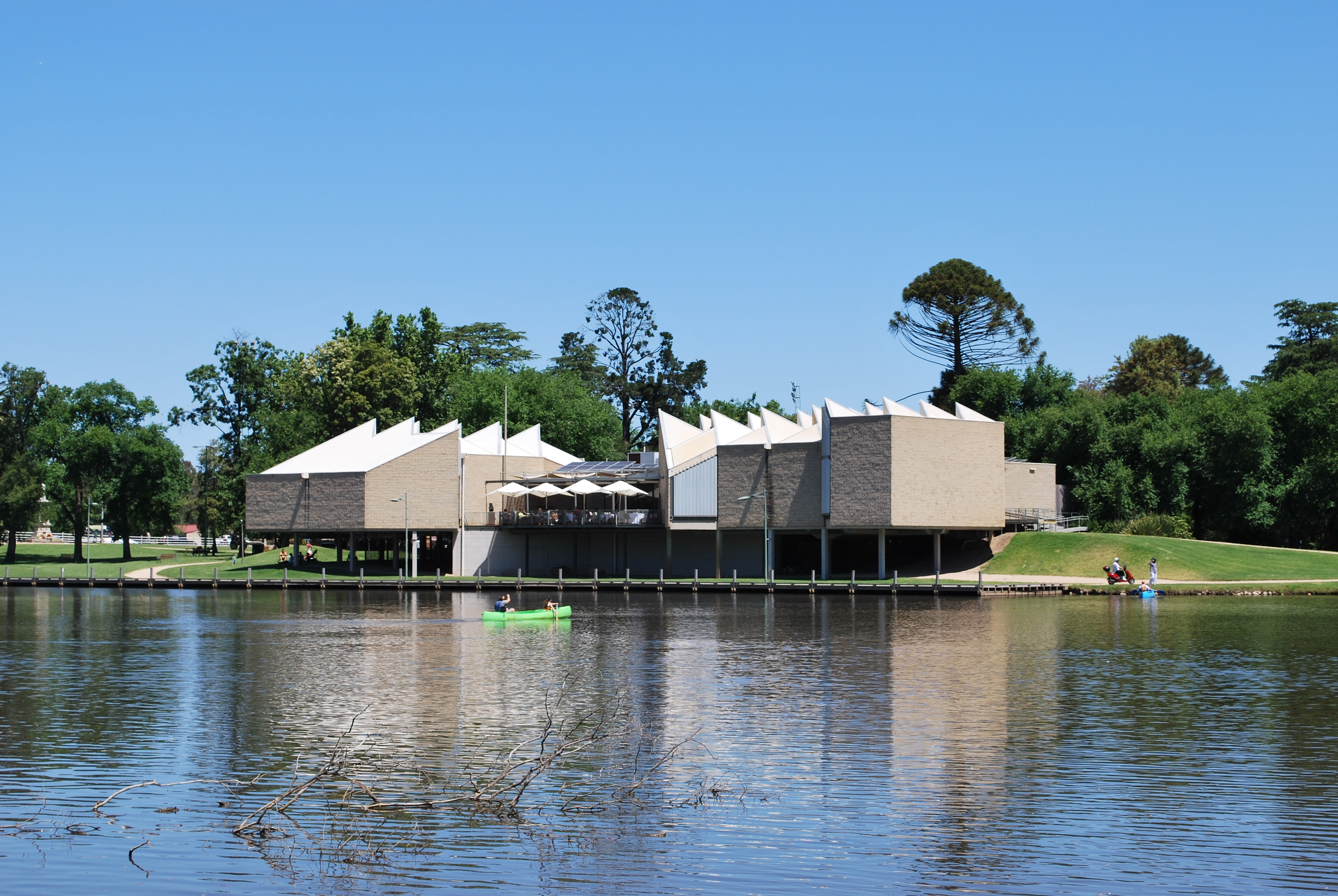
- Established: 1975
- Location: Botanical Gardens, Bridge Street, Benalla, VIC 3672
- Coordinates: 36°33′9″S 145°58′46″E
- Type: Art gallery
- Website: http://www.benallaartgallery.com.au

Benalla Art Gallery is a public art gallery in the regional town of Benalla, Victoria, Australia.

The Benalla Art Gallery is a free, public gallery in Benalla, which opened in 1975. Victoria's Herald Sun newspaper described it in 2013 as one of Victoria's top ten regional galleries, with a "striking modernist building". The gallery complex was designed by Colin Munro and Philip Sargeant. The gallery's original design was reduced in size, culminating in an expansion proposal being canvassed in 2013.

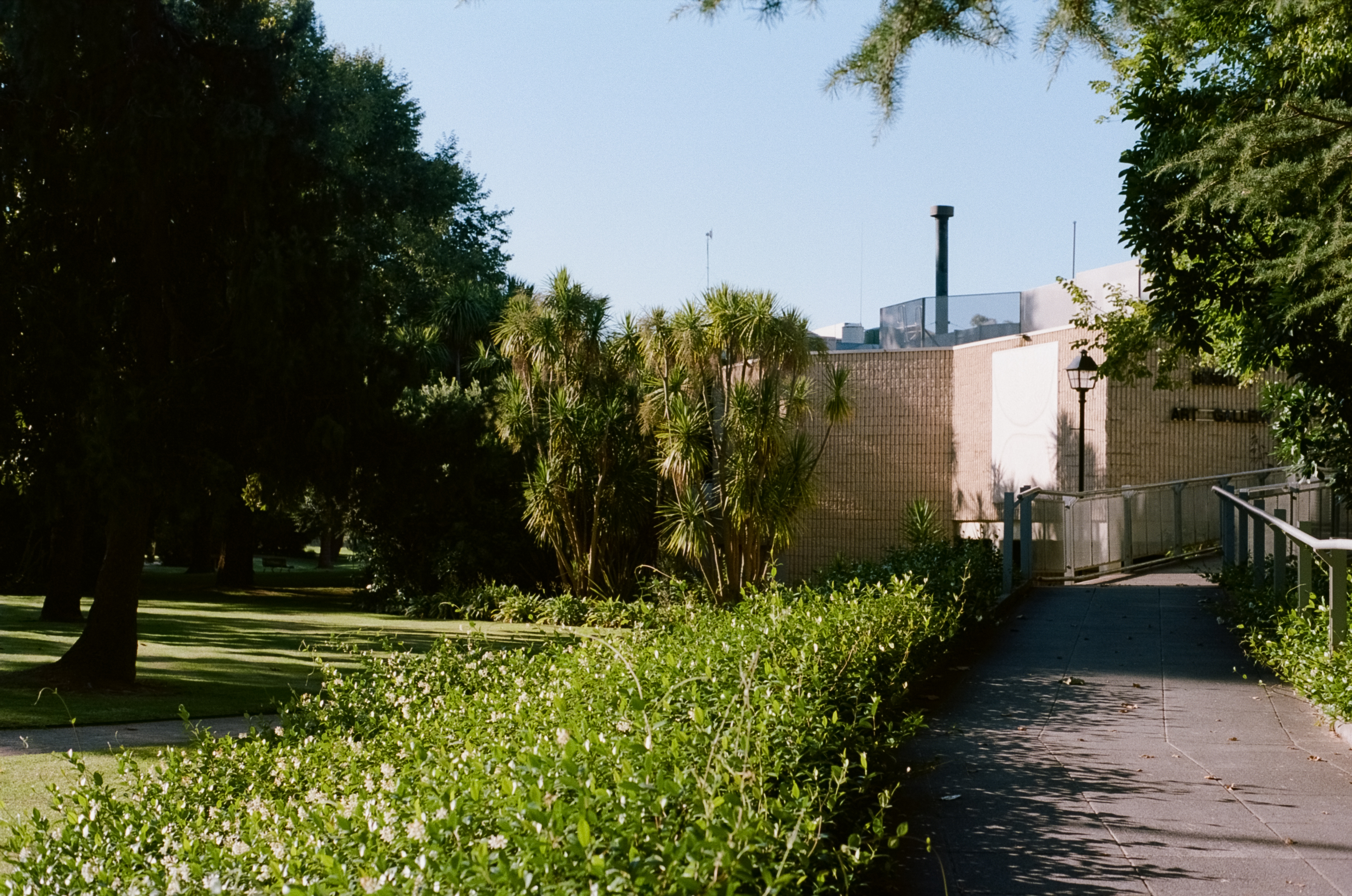
Benalla Art Gallery entrance

In 2013 a new art prize was announced for a work of the naked human figure. The winner of the non-acquisitive $50,000 2014 Benalla Nude Art Prize for 2014 was Juan Davila. Artists whose work is held by the Benalla Art Gallery include Constance Stokes and Jan Hendrik Scheltema.

The gallery is a member of the Public Galleries Association of Victoria.

== History ==
With the aim of founding a new art gallery in Benalla, Laurence Ledger donated a collection of art to the City of Benalla in 1972, including works by Arthur Streeton and Hans Heysen. Ledger additionally offered a sum of A$75,000 to the city with the aim of constructing a gallery on the then-yet to be built Lake Benalla. A petition was lodged by Peter Hale in January 1973, containing 236 signatures and advocating against the City of Benalla's proposal to take a loan of A$65,000 over 40 years to fund the gallery's construction, as well as A$35,000 to construct Lake Benalla. As a result, a referendum over the proposal was scheduled for 3 February. Premier Rupert Hamer warned that the referendum's failure could lead to a halting of the Lake Benalla project, as the gallery was meant to serve as the lake's centerpiece. The council of the City of Benalla was vociferously in favour of the proposal, distributing fliers and how-to-vote cards in support of the loan.

Referendum results
- 3 February 1973
- Approving loans for the construction of Benalla Art Gallery and Lake Benalla

Results
Choice	Votes	%
Yes	2,622	84.50%
No	449	14.47%
Informal	32	1.03%

The referendum passed in a landslide, with voters in favour of approving the loans to fund the gallery and lake projects. Voting was compulsory. C. H. Chiswell, mayor of the City of Benalla, commented at the referendum's passage that tenders for the gallery would be called for within weeks, with the gallery expected to be constructed by the end of 1973.
