= Mark Soyer =

Australian para-alpine skier

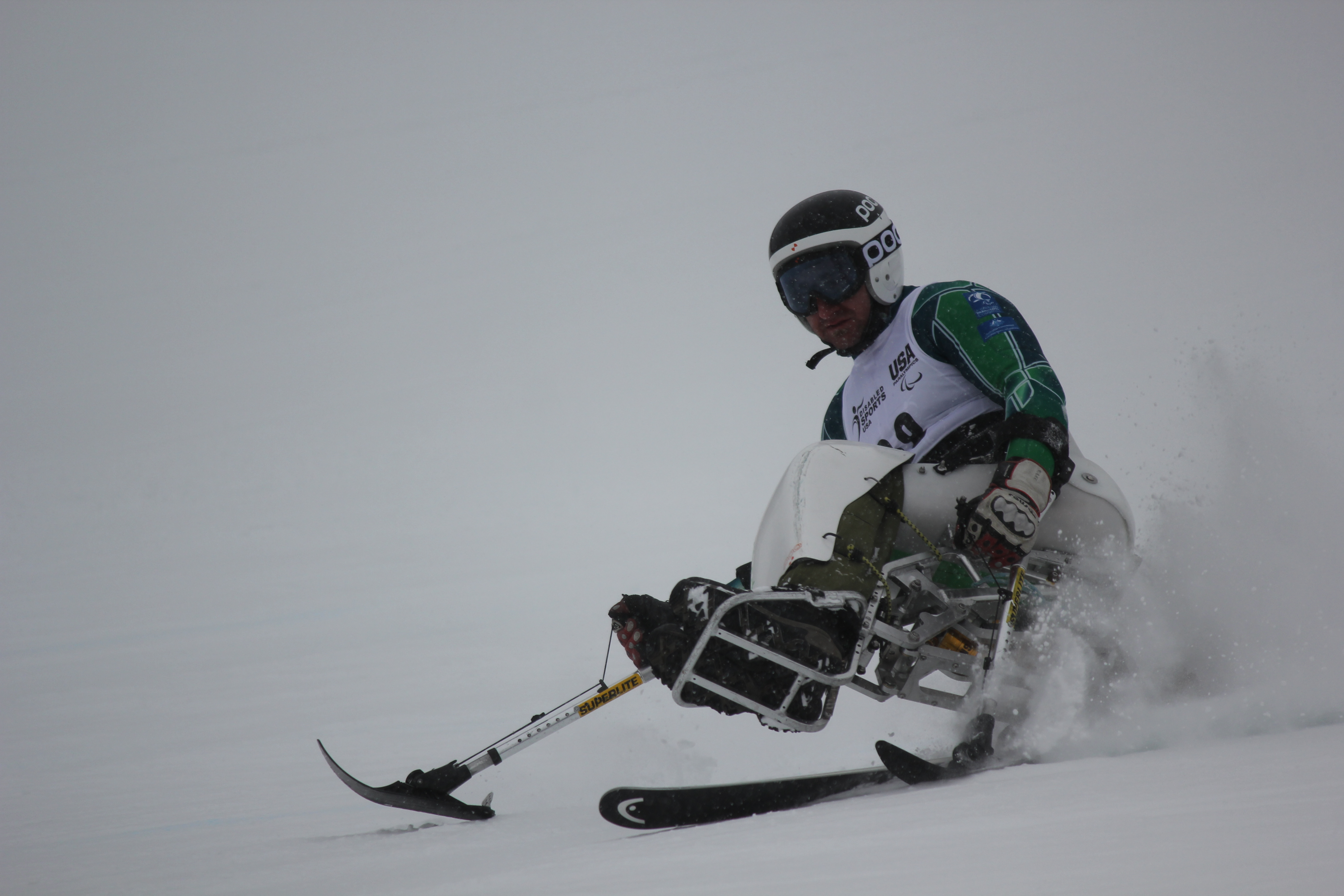
- Soyer at the 2012 IPC NorAm Cup

Personal information
- Born: 24 April 1978 (age 48) Benalla, Victoria, Australia

Sport
- Country: Australia
- Sport: Para-alpine skiing
- Events: Downhill; Super-G; Giant Slalom; Slalom
Medal record
New Zealand Winter Games
Bronze medal – third place	2011 Queenstown	Giant Slalom Sitting
Bronze medal – third place	2011 Queenstown	Super G Sitting

Mark Soyer (born 24 April 1978) is an Australian para-alpine LW11 classified skier. He dealt with leukaemia twice as a child. At the age of 26, he severed his spinal cord during an accident while riding his motorbike on his parents' farm, and subsequently tried several different sports. Working as a manufacturing jeweller and gemologist in Melbourne, he has also been involved with para-skiing as a volunteer, and serving in administrative roles for various organisations. In 2007, he was a finalist for the Pride of Australia awards for courage.

Soyer took up skiing following his accident after attending a camp in Australia. He then travelled to Colorado to attend another camp, before coming back to Australia to attend another camp. In 2007, he was ranked as Australia's second best sit-skier, and was in the top 50 skiers in the world. He attempted to make the 2010 Winter Paralympics. He earned bronze medals at skiing events in New Zealand in 2011. In 2012, he was a member of the Australian Paralympic skiing team, based out of the Australian Institute of Sports, and was trying to secure a spot for the 2014 Winter Paralympics in Sochi, Russia. He represented Australia at the 2018 Winter Paralympics.

== Personal ==
As a three-year-old, Soyer was diagnosed with leukaemia, and doctors were pessimistic about his chances for survival. Despite being declared cancer free by the age of six, the cancer came back when he was eight years old. As a child, he played Australian rules football and was a member of Little Athletics. He attended Benalla College.

In November 2004, at the age of 26, Soyer severed his spinal cord during an accident while riding his motorbike on his parents' farm. He was keen to exercise as soon as he could during his rehabilitation. He tried several sports, including wheelchair tennis, wheelchair rugby and wheelchair basketball, following his accident in an attempt to find one that made him feel able-bodied. He drove dune buggies and tried kayaking, and in 2007 was learning how to para-glide.

In 2007 and 2008, Soyer worked as a manufacturing jeweller and gemologist in Melbourne. He volunteers for Disabled Winter Sport Australia as a ski guide. From 2005 to 2008, he raised more than AUD$7,500 to assist other Australian para-skiers afford equipment to compete. At the same time, he also gave skiing lessons. He is also on the board of Able Management Group, an organisation assisting people with disabilities to get into para-alpine skiing, where he serves on the Fundraising Committee. He was involved in the founding of the AMG Free Ride Team. He is also part of the Australian Paralympic Committee's WorkCoverSA Paralympian Speakers Program. In 2007, he helped conduct three adaptive skiing camps in Victoria, and was a finalist for the Pride of Australia awards for courage.

== Skiing ==
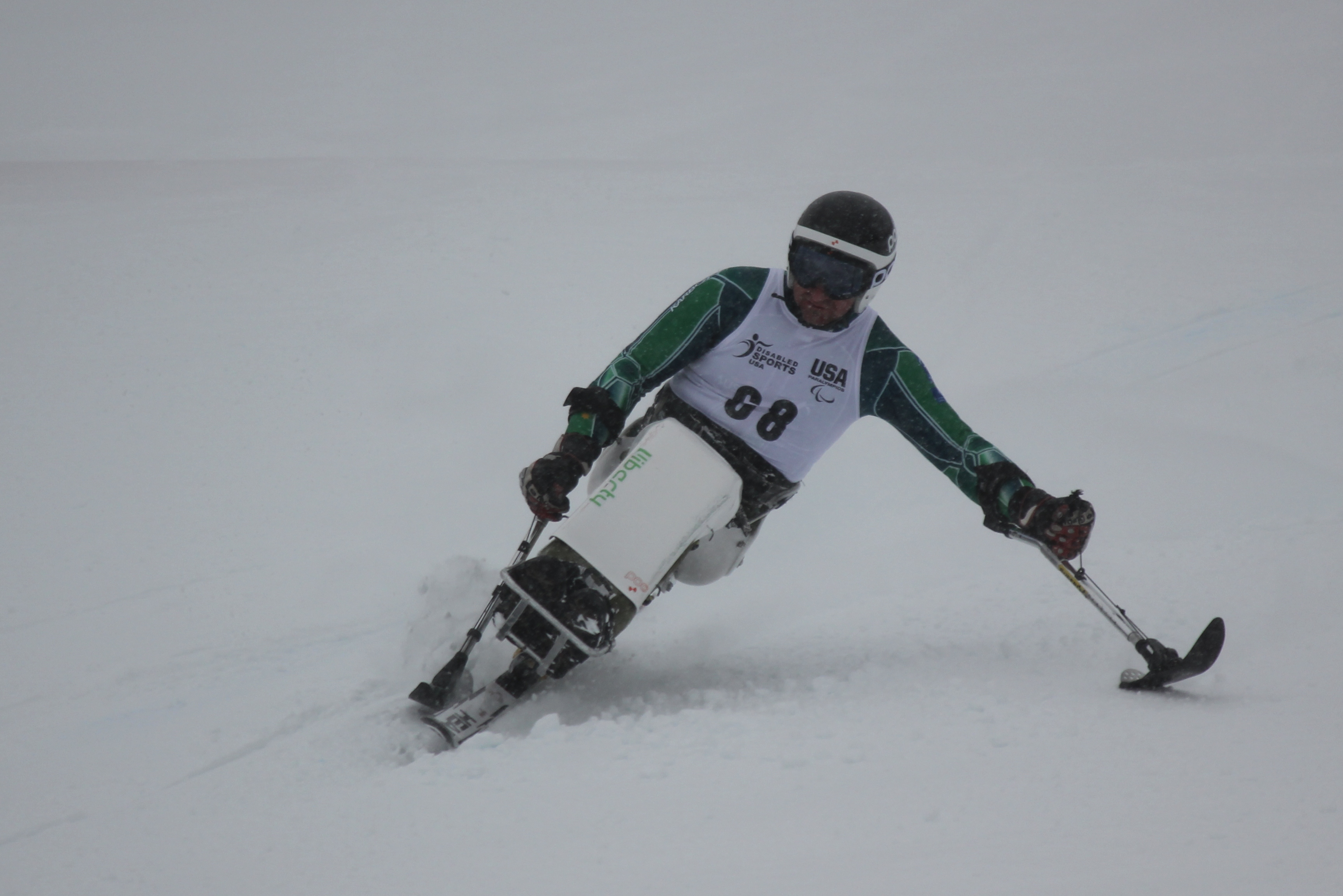
Soyer at the 2012 IPC NorAm Cup

Soyer is an LW11 classified skier, who skied before his accident. He took up sit-skiing while rehabilitating from his injuries, and was able to adapt to a mono-ski within the first day of trying it at a Disability Wintersport Australia camp at Falls Creek. Before the year was out following that camp, he went to Colorado and participated in a skiing camp specifically for people who use monoskis. During the following Australian ski season, he participated in a learn to ski race camp at Thredbo.

Soyer trains at Mount Hotham and Falls Creek in Australia, and in Colorado in the United States. In 2007, he was ranked as Australia's second best sit-skier and was in the top 50 skiers in the world. In December of that year, he competed at the Hartford Ski Spectacular at the Beaver Run Resort in Breckenridge, Colorado where he finished thirteenth in the giant slalom, with a time of 1:09.12 in his first run, and 1:08.67 in his second run for a combined run time of 2:17.79.

In 2008, Soyer was trying to qualify for the 2010 Winter Paralympics. At that time, he was the second ranked skier in his class in Australia, and ranked in the top 60 in the world. Going into the 2008/2009 ski season, he needed to raise AUD$20,000 to allow him to compete internationally to qualify for the Games. In August 2009, he competed in the Winter Games NZ at Coronet Peak in the men's sitting LW11 slalom event. At the 2011 New Zealand Winter Games, he finished third in the men's sitting giant slalom event with a time of 1:46.08. Arriving late to the event, he did not have much training time to learn the course. At another skiing event in 2011 in Mt Hutt, New Zealand, he finished third in the Super G. He competed at the 2011 IPC Alpine Skiing Noram Cup at Copper Mountain, Colorado, where he earned three fourth-place finishes and one seventh-place finish. Early in his trip, prior to competing, he broke his race ski and had equipment difficulties at the Noram Cup as a result. He had a time of 2:00.69 in the giant slalom race. In 2012, he was a member of the Australian Paralympic skiing team, based out of the Australian Institute of Sports, and was trying to secure a spot for the 2014 Winter Paralympics. In January 2012, he was in Austria to compete at the Abtenau IPCAS. That year, Liberty Skis Corporation signed him to its professional team.

His results at the 2017 IPC Alpine Skiing World Championships in Tarvisio, Italy were 13th in the Giant Slalom Sitting and Slalom Sitting, 17th in the Super G Sitting and did not finish in the Super Combined Sitting.

At the 2018 Winter Paralympics, he competed in five events. He did not finish in three events and was 16th in the Men's Super-G Sitting and 18th in the Men's Giant Slalom, Sitting.
