= Nillahcootie Dam =

- Location of the Nillahcootie Dam in Victoria
- Country: Australia
- Location: Victorian Alps, Victoria
- Coordinates: 36°52′41″S 146°00′10″E
- Purpose: Water supply; Irrigation
- Status: Operational
- Opening date: 1967
- Operator: Goulburn–Murray Water

Dam and spillways
- Type of dam: Embankment dam
- Impounds: Broken River
- Height: 34 m (112 ft)
- Length: 791 m (2,595 ft)
- Spillway type: Gothic arch-shaped crest
- Spillway capacity: 73 m^{3}/s (2,600 cu ft/s)

Reservoir
- Creates: Lake Nillahcootie
- Total capacity: 40,400 ML (8,900×10^{6} imp gal; 10,700×10^{6} US gal)
- Catchment area: 439 km^{2} (169 sq mi)
- Surface area: 530 ha (1,300 acres)
- Website; Lake Nillahcootie at Goulburn–Murray Water

The Nillahcootie Dam, a rock and earth-fill embankment dam with a unique Gothic arch-shaped crest spillway across the Broken River that is located near Mansfield, in the Alpine region of Victoria, Australia. The dam's purpose is for the supply of potable water and for irrigation. The impounded reservoir is called Lake Nillahcootie.

== Location and features ==
Designed and constructed by the State Rivers and Water Supply Commission of Victoria, the dam was completed in 1967. The embankment dam wall is constructed with an earth core and rock fill, rising to a height of 34 metres (112 ft). The core component materials of the wall include 298 thousand cubic metres (10.5×10^{6} cu ft) of rock and earth. The reservoir has a capacity of 40,400 megalitres (8,887×10^{6} imp gal; 10,673×10^{6} US gal), and can release a maximum outflow of approximately 117,000 megalitres (25,736×10^{6} imp gal; 30,908×10^{6} US gal) per day in normal operation.

The crest of the uncontrolled spillway is 264.5 metres (868 ft) AHD and the embankment is approximately 791 metres (2,595 ft) long. When full, flood flows spill over a unique Gothic arch-shaped crest. The storage also features a secondary spillway that is operated only during severe floods. It uses the ‘fuse plug' principle, in which a section of earthen embankment within the secondary spillway (the fuse plug) has been designed so that at a predetermined flood level it will be eroded away and increase the discharge through the spillway.

== Recreation ==
It is a popular water-skiing destination, especially during the summer. There is a boat ramp at the northern end with a large car park, public toilets and a mobile coffee van most days.

The name is of Indian origin and is thought to mean "Blue House".

== See also ==
- List of dams in Victoria
