= Shayne Greenman =

Australian artisan baker, sugar craftsman and culinary artist

Shayne Greenman (born 11 January 1969 in Benalla, Victoria, Australia) is an Australian artisan baker, sugar craftsman and culinary artist.

In early 2012, Greenman became the gold medallist in the Australian Artisan Baking Cup and was the World Championship Artisan baker at the SIGEP Baking Cup in Rimini, Italy. In late 2012 he won the Australian Culinary Challenge Decorated Cake Award, Greenman placed Top 5 in the International Baking Association Cup in Munich, Germany. Greenman was also invited to visit the Ecole Gastonomique Bellouet Conseil, Le Cordon Bleu Culinary Institute and L’Atelier Des Sens in Paris, France.

Greenman competed at the 2014 Cake Decorating Championships held in Sydney Olympic Park. at the Cake, Bake and Sweets Show and won two first prizes in Masters Division, one for a sugarcraft piece depicting the birth of a dragonfly and another Novelty cake depicting a 1920s fortune teller a life size bust sculpted out of cake and was a finalist in a third category Masters Wedding cake section depicting a spring pond with two sculpted white swans entwined around a nest of hatching eggs surrounded with bull rushes water lilies and water iris.

In September 2014, Greenman travelled to the U.S. to be an International guest demonstrator at the 21st Birthday celebrations of Oklahoma State Sugar Art Show created by Kerry Vincent His Grand National Wedding Cake Competition entry which was completed in under four days won him a Silver Medal Placement along with the other finalists in the competition.

Greenman has also worked as an actor, appearing in a range of Australian films and television series from the 1980s until the mid-2000s.
