= Lake Benalla =

Lake in Victoria, Australia

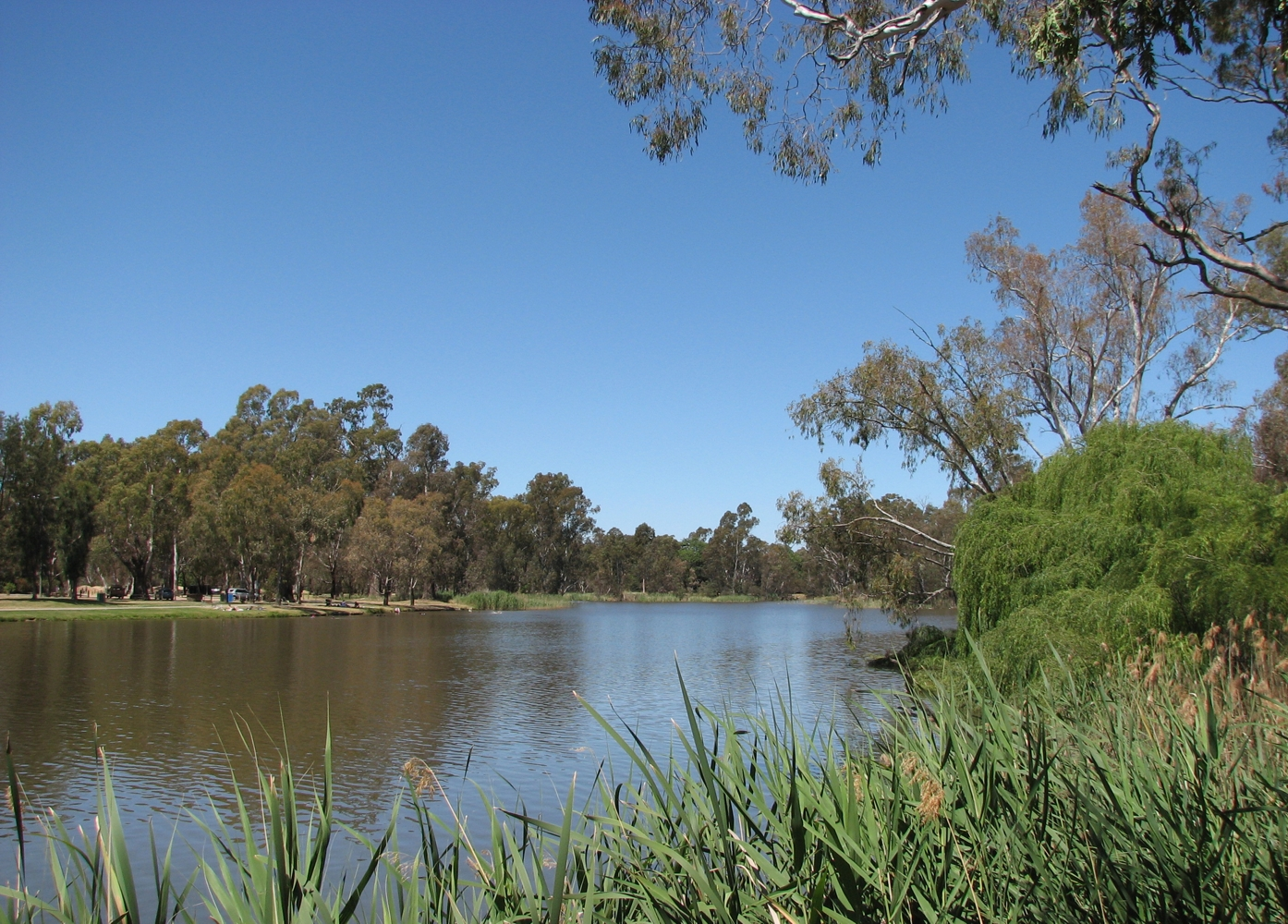
- View of Lake Benalla, from the south east, in 2006.

- Location in Victoria
- Location: High Country, Victoria
- Coordinates: 36°33′06″S 145°58′47″E
- Type: Artificial
- River sources: Broken River
- Basin countries: Australia
- Surface area: 16 ha (40 acres)
- Surface elevation: 170 m (560 ft) AHD
- Frozen: Never
- Islands: 7
- Settlements: Benalla

Lake Benalla (/bəˈnælə/), an artificial lake located in Benalla in the High Country region of Victoria, Australia, was created in the 1970s.

In 2010, more than one hundred residents surrounding the lake were evacuated from their homes at Benalla. The river peaked in the city at 4.1 metres (13 ft) which was 40 centimetres (16 in) above its major flood level. A retaining wall built in approximately 1960 to ward off floods kept the flood water level under control.

The Benalla Botanical Gardens are located on the shore of Lake Benalla.

The lake is crossed by the Hume Freeway.

== See also ==
- List of lakes of Australia
