= Benalla P-12 College =

Coordinates: 36°32′55″S 145°59′28″E

Benalla P–12 College
- Benalla, Victoria; Australia

Information
- School type: Public, co-educational, primary/secondary day school
- Motto: Together We Achieve
- Established: 1912
- Principal: Kylie Cotter
- Grades: P–12
- Colours: Dark blue, light blue and white
- Website: www.benallap12.vic.edu.au/

Benalla P–12 College is a state college located in the regional town of Benalla which is located on the Hume Highway in central Victoria, Australia, on the Melbourne to Sydney Highway, 180 km north-north-east of Melbourne. It was one of the first high schools established in Victoria by the government.

== About the school ==
Benalla P–12 College has three campuses: the Faithfull Campus, Waller Campus and Avon Campus. The Faithfull campus houses the students from Years 5–12 and is located on the site of the former Benalla Technical College. The main office and administration activities occur on the Faithfull campus. In 2019, the Weary Dunlop Education Centre opened on the Faithfull campus to students in years 10–12. This saw the closure of the old Dunlop campus.

== History ==
The Dunlop Campus was founded in 1912 as Benalla High School. In 1994 it amalgamated with the Benalla Secondary College to form Benalla College.

== Notable alumni ==
- Wilfred Arthur Baird (known as Arthur) – the foundation engineer for Qantas
- Sir Edward "Weary" Dunlop – an Australian surgeon who was renowned for his leadership whilst being held prisoner by the Japanese during World War II.
- Ella Hooper – musician
- Mark Soyer – paralympic skier
- Hector Waller DSO and Bar – Captain of HMAS Perth during World War Two. Mentioned in Dispatches. Died during the sinking of HMAS Perth, 1942 during the Battle of the Sunda Strait.
