= Benalla =

- City
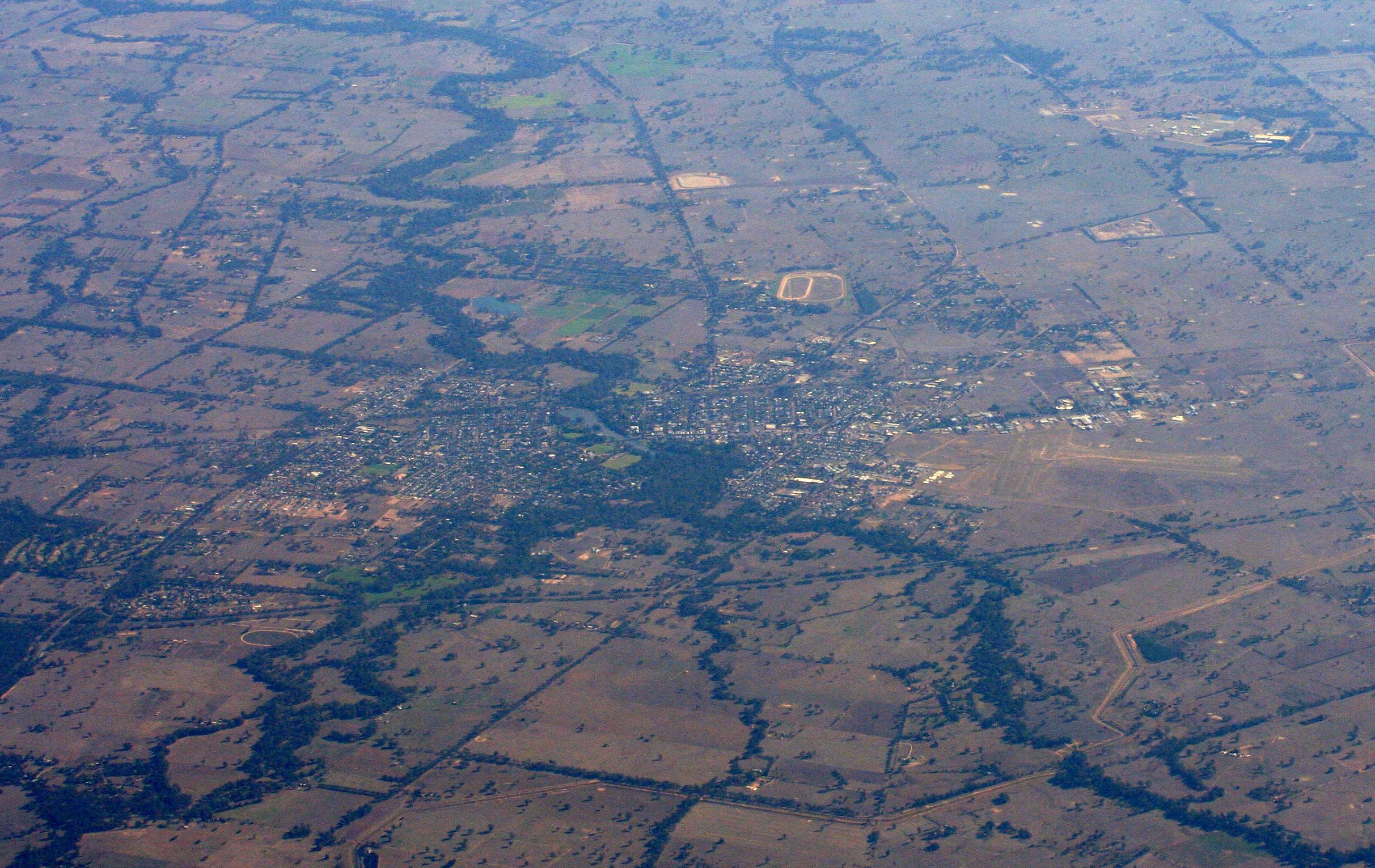
- Aerial view from the east
- Nickname: Rose City
- Interactive map of Benalla
- Coordinates: 36°33′07″S 145°58′54″E
- Country: Australia
- State: Victoria
- Region: Hume
- LGA: Rural City of Benalla
- Location: 40.5 km (25.2 mi) SW of Wangaratta; 212 km (132 mi) NNE of Melbourne; 61 km (38 mi) ESE of Shepparton
- Established: 1840s

Government
  - State electorate: Euroa
  - Federal division: Indi

Area
  - Total: 315.3 km^{2} (121.7 sq mi)
- Elevation: 169.5 m (556 ft)

Population
  - Total: 9,316 (2021 census)
  - Density: 29.546/km^{2} (76.525/sq mi)
- Postcode: 3672
- Mean max temp: 21.9 °C (71.4 °F)
- Mean min temp: 8.7 °C (47.7 °F)
- Annual rainfall: 668.3 mm (26.31 in)

Benalla /bəˈnælə/ is a small city in the Hume region of Victoria, Australia. The town sits on the Broken River, about 212 kilometres (130 mi) north east of the state capital Melbourne. As of the 2021 census, the population was 9,316. It is the administrative centre for the Rural City of Benalla local government area. It is colloquially known as the Rose City.

== History ==
Prior to the European settlement of Australia, the Benalla region was populated by the Taungurung people, an Indigenous Australian people. A 1906 history recounts that prior to white settlement "as many as 400 blacks would meet together in the vicinity of Benalla to hold a corrobboree". The area was first explored in 1824 by Hamilton Hume and William Hovell, who recorded an agricultural settlement called "Swampy". The expedition was followed by that of Major Thomas Mitchell in 1834.

An attack by indigenous people on the camp of shepherds working for George and William Faithful became known as the Faithful Massacre; eight settlers were killed in the incident. Following the massacre, in 1839 a police station was established to provide protection of over-landers, and the name of the settlement became Broken River.

The post office opened on 1 December 1844 originally named Broken River. A bridge was built over the Broken River in 1847 and the following year the town was surveyed. In 1849, it was proclaimed a town. It was proclaimed a city in 1965.

In 1936, the Benalla Centenary Race was held.

== Geography ==
Benalla is situated on a mostly flat floodplain of the Broken River catchment situated directly to the north and west of the Great Dividing Range. Lake Benalla is an artificial lake created in 1973 from the Broken River as an ornamental feature for the centre of the city. Broken river forms a green belt along the north–south spine of the city. There are three major crossings of the river at Benalla. The main street in the Central Business District is Bridge Street East.

Another large artificial lake, Lake Mokoan, 7 kilometres to the north east, was decommissioned beginning in 2009, with a wetlands area being developed for visitors. To the south of the freeway is the heavily forested Reef Hills State Park.

=== Climate ===
Benalla has a humid subtropical climate (Cfa) bordering on an oceanic climate (Cfb). Summers are mostly warm to hot, sunny and dry with a very low relative humidity (a mean 3 pm reading of just 32% in January), while winters are cool and cloudy with modest rainfall. A heavy fall of snow was observed in Benalla on 31 May 1913.

Climate data for Benalla (Shadforth Street, 1903–2006, extremes 1957–2006); 170 m AMSL; 36.55° S, 145.97° E
| Month | Jan | Feb | Mar | Apr | May | Jun | Jul | Aug | Sep | Oct | Nov | Dec | Year |
|---|---|---|---|---|---|---|---|---|---|---|---|---|---|
| Record high °C (°F) | 43.5 (110.3) | 42.4 (108.3) | 39.4 (102.9) | 35.0 (95.0) | 27.2 (81.0) | 23.3 (73.9) | 22.8 (73.0) | 25.7 (78.3) | 29.5 (85.1) | 35.2 (95.4) | 40.5 (104.9) | 41.8 (107.2) | 43.5 (110.3) |
| Mean daily maximum °C (°F) | 31.0 (87.8) | 30.8 (87.4) | 27.4 (81.3) | 22.2 (72.0) | 17.4 (63.3) | 13.8 (56.8) | 12.8 (55.0) | 14.6 (58.3) | 17.7 (63.9) | 21.4 (70.5) | 25.4 (77.7) | 28.8 (83.8) | 21.9 (71.5) |
| Mean daily minimum °C (°F) | 14.9 (58.8) | 14.8 (58.6) | 12.2 (54.0) | 8.6 (47.5) | 5.8 (42.4) | 3.7 (38.7) | 3.2 (37.8) | 4.0 (39.2) | 5.8 (42.4) | 8.0 (46.4) | 10.5 (50.9) | 12.9 (55.2) | 8.7 (47.7) |
| Record low °C (°F) | 4.0 (39.2) | 4.8 (40.6) | 2.8 (37.0) | −0.5 (31.1) | −3.4 (25.9) | −4.5 (23.9) | −4.2 (24.4) | −3.6 (25.5) | −2.5 (27.5) | −0.8 (30.6) | 1.3 (34.3) | 3.2 (37.8) | −4.5 (23.9) |
| Average precipitation mm (inches) | 40.7 (1.60) | 35.9 (1.41) | 43.7 (1.72) | 49.2 (1.94) | 63.4 (2.50) | 73.7 (2.90) | 72.0 (2.83) | 71.3 (2.81) | 63.3 (2.49) | 64.7 (2.55) | 48.0 (1.89) | 42.8 (1.69) | 668.3 (26.31) |
| Average precipitation days (≥ 0.2 mm) | 4.7 | 4.0 | 5.1 | 6.3 | 9.2 | 11.4 | 12.8 | 12.7 | 10.6 | 9.3 | 6.6 | 5.5 | 98.2 |
| Average afternoon relative humidity (%) | 32 | 35 | 39 | 46 | 58 | 66 | 67 | 61 | 55 | 49 | 41 | 35 | 49 |
Source: Australian Bureau of Meteorology; Benalla (Shadforth Street)

== Culture ==
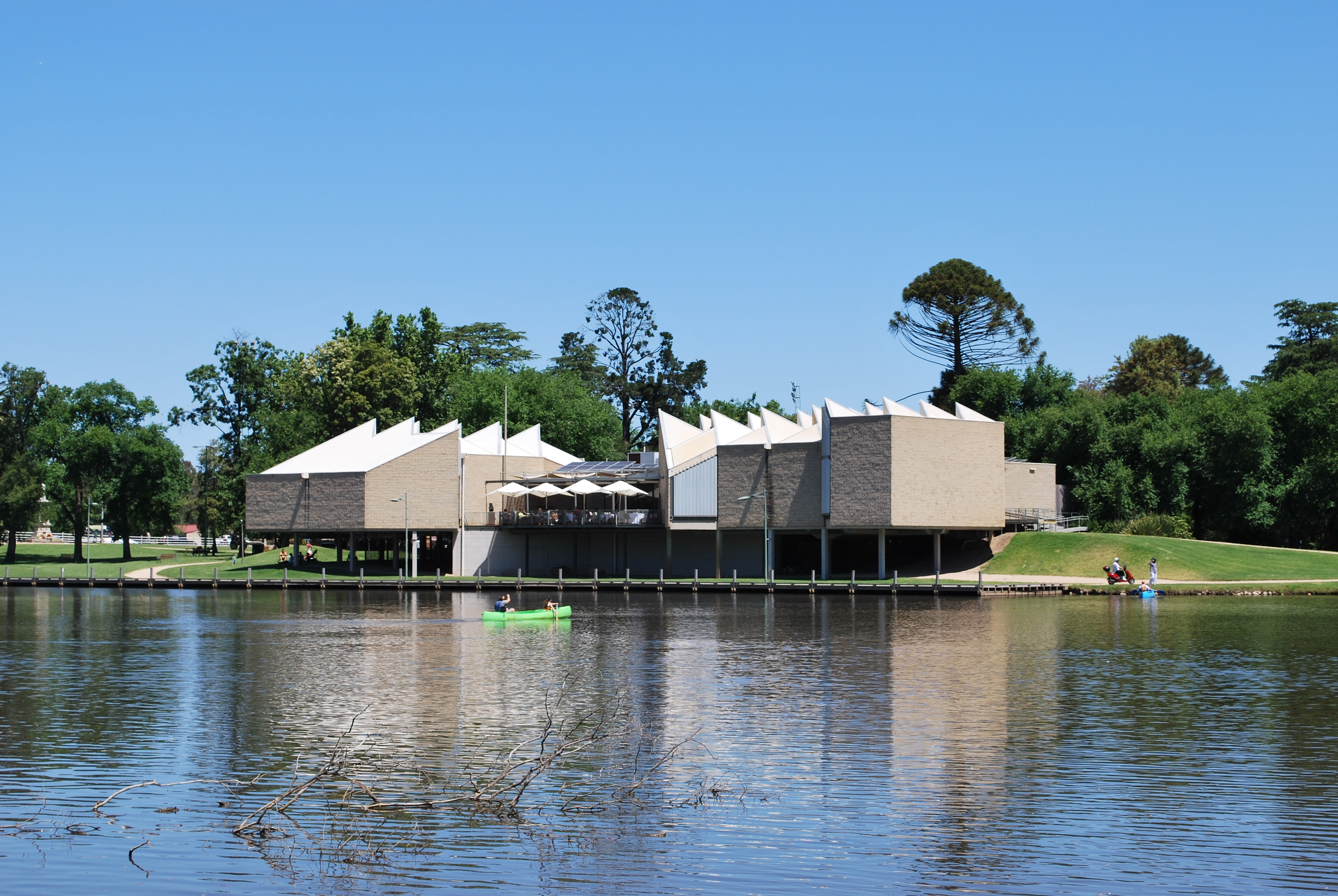
Benalla Art Gallery

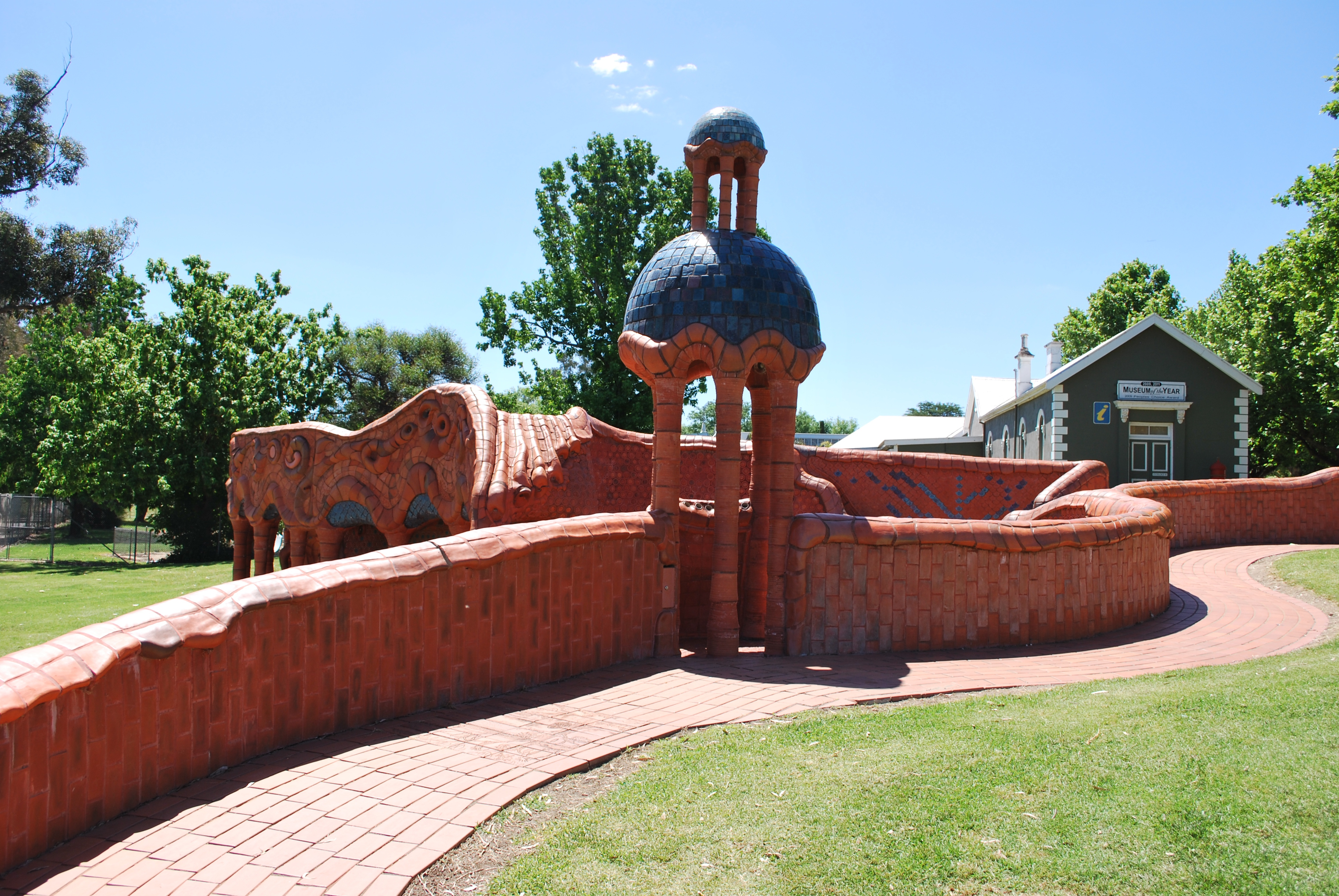
Benalla Terracotta Mural Garden and Amphitheatre

Benalla's cultural facilities include the Benalla Performing Arts and Convention Centre which includes a cinema and theatre. The city also has a major art gallery which forms a landmark perched over Lake Benalla on the site of the original police station.

Benalla has more than 50 murals on the CBD Benalla Street Art trail, and beyond including local villages such as Goorambat and Winton Wetlands. The annual Wall to Wall Street Art Festival has been held since 2015, curated by Juddy Roller Studios, usually the week before Easter. Over one long-weekend dozens of world class artists create one giant outdoor gallery in the town. The Wall to Wall Festival also includes workshops, artist talks, live music, markets, street art tours and more.

Benalla is also home to a former artist's hub known as North East Artisans – an entirely self funded, not for profit community art gallery run by volunteers established in 2014, shutting down in 2022. It featured a shop gallery with the works of local artists, an exhibition space, artist studios and a cafe, with regular exhibitions and live music events featuring local, national and international musicians. On 31 August 2022, the Gallery Shop at 28C Carrier street closed for business. They planned to keep the website as a "'virtual archive' celebrating the 'life and times' of NEA until the subscription ceases". The website was last heard from on 12th December 2022.

The Benalla Festival is another annual local garden festival dating from 1967, then known as the "Rose Festival. It is held over the first two weekends in November with dozens of free and low cost events including the community Street Parade, Music by the Lake and fireworks, and A Day in the Gardens Market held in the Benalla Botanical Gardens. Events in the festival are described as a "collaboration of community efforts that encompass art, music, dance, history, sport, family attractions, exhibitions and much more."

== Sport and recreation ==
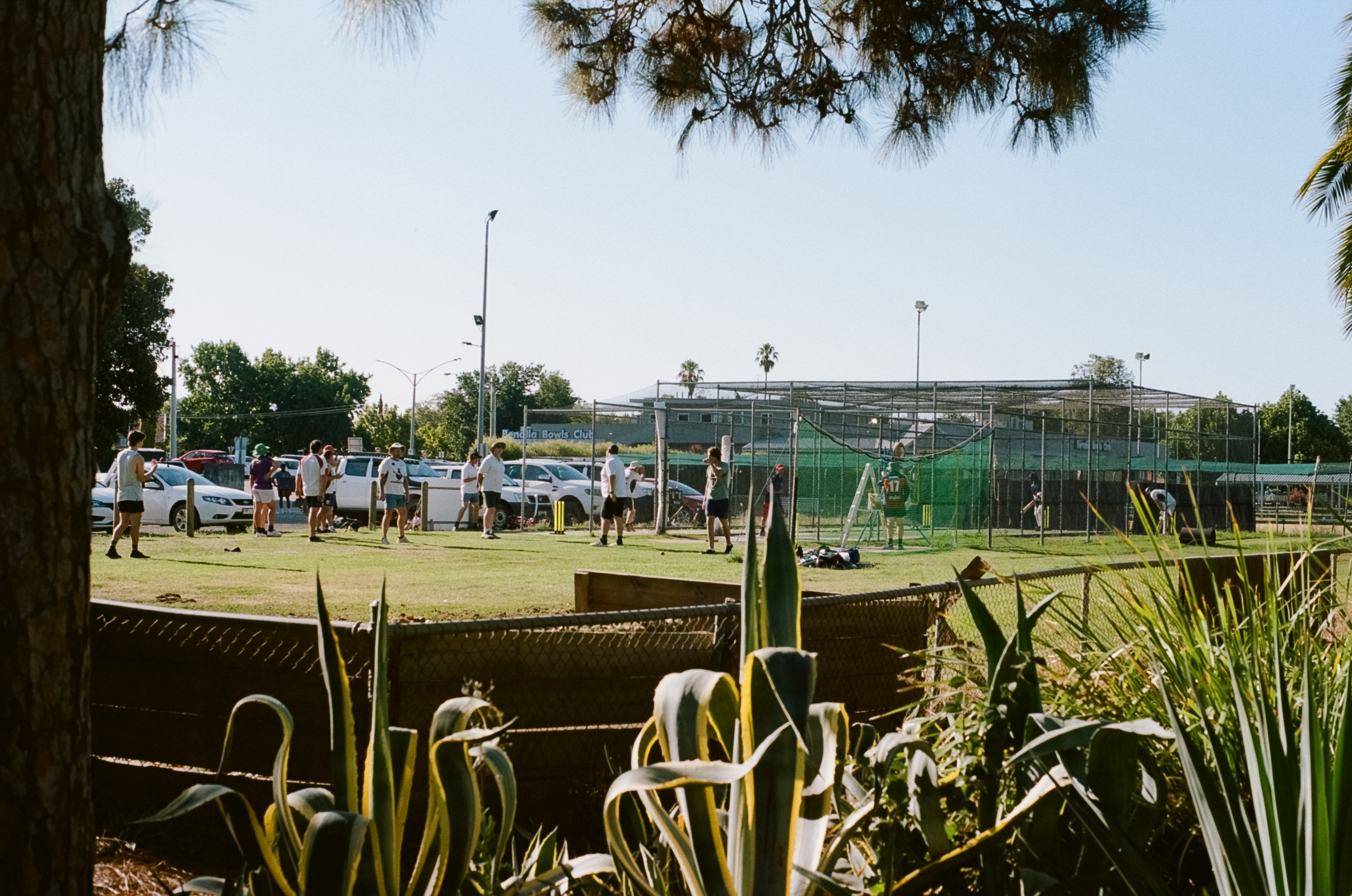
Benalla District Cricket players during afternoon practice

The town has an Australian rules football and netball club (Benalla Saints) with multiple teams competing in the Goulburn Valley Football League and a team (Benalla All Blacks) competing in the Ovens & King Football League.

Benalla has a horse racing club, the Benalla Racing Club, which schedules around eleven race meetings a year including the Benalla Cup meeting in early October.

Benalla Wolfpack play rugby league in NRL Victoria's Murray Cup.

Golfers play at the Benalla Golf Club on Mansfield Road, which celebrated its centenary in 2003 or at the course of the Golden Vale Golf Club on Golden Vale Road, Benalla.

Benalla is also the closest major centre to Winton Motor Raceway, a privately owned motor racing circuit which holds motor racing event at all levels of domestic competition, including V8 Supercar.

Benalla Gardens Oval is the home of the Benalla & District Cricket Association. The ground has hosted touring teams since the 19th century. In the Rural City of Benalla there are numerous cricket grounds.

Benalla is also home to the Benalla Bandits Baseball Club who compete in the North East Baseball Association. The team plays out of Racecourse Reserve, Benalla.

Benalla is home to the Gliding Club of Victoria at the State Gliding Centre located on the Benalla airfield.

There is a park and walking track that circumnavigates Lake Benalla, featuring a ceramic sculpture mural community that was created as part of an employment project for local artists.

Benalla Sports Carnival

There was once an annual Benalla Sports Carnival, consisting of athletics, cycling and wood chopping events that commenced in April 1932, initially to assist with funding for the Benalla Football Club, with the carnival being held on the Benalla Showgrounds and the foot running was held under the supervision of the Victorian Athletic League. Unfortunately the 1932 carnival was cancelled due to wet weather.

Benalla Gift Winners
| Year | Winner | City (from) | Handicap | Time (secs) | Comments |
|---|---|---|---|---|---|
| 1932 | | | | | |
| 1933 | | | | | |
| 1934 | | | | | |
| 1935 | | | | | |
| 1936 | | | | | |
| 1937 | | | | | |
| 1938 | | | | | |
| 1939 | | | | | |
| 1940 | | | | | |

== Heritage ==
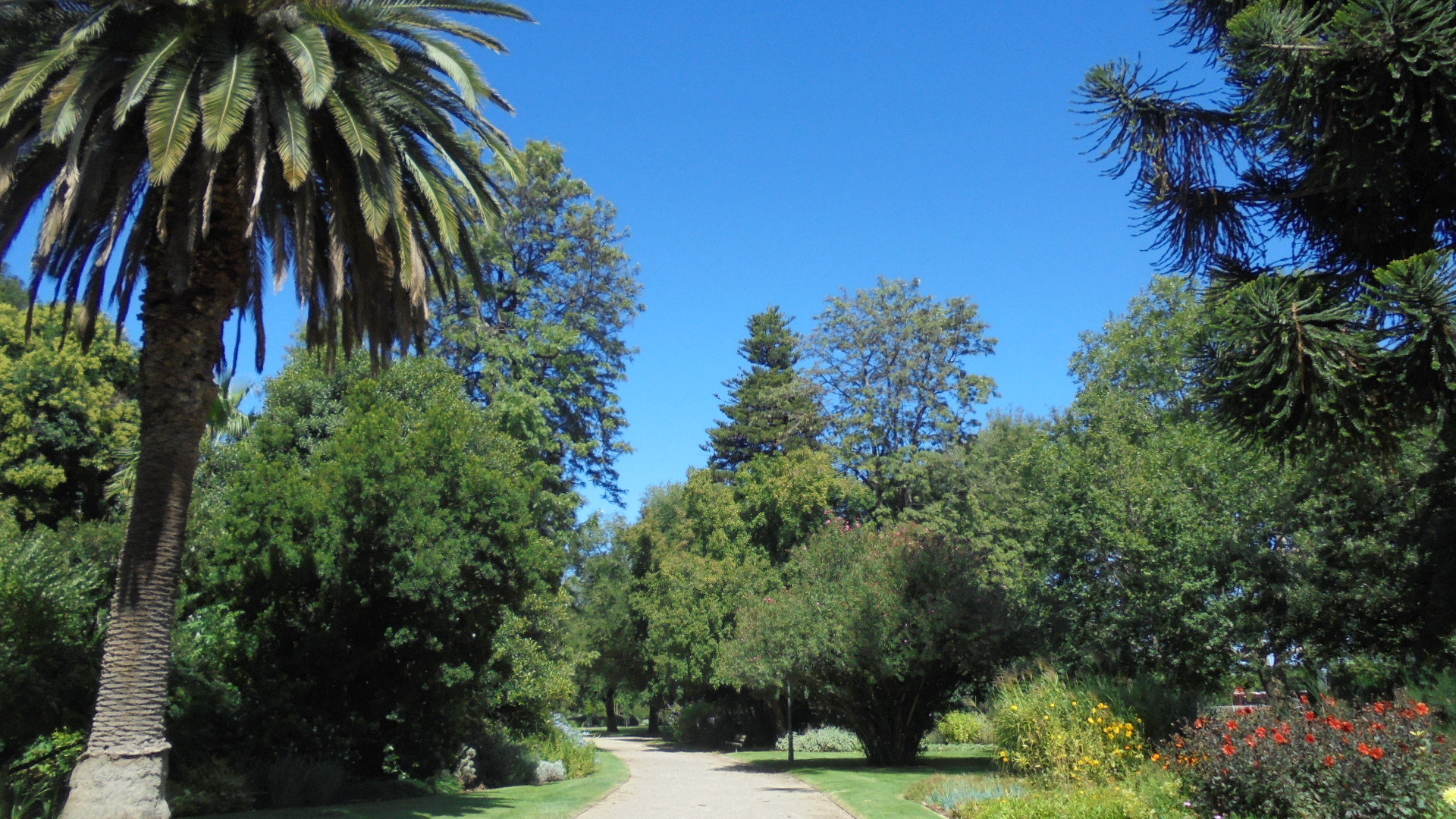
Benalla Botanical Gardens

The following sites are National Trust sites.

- Benalla Botanical Gardens.
- Stringybark Creek Site, famous in the Ned Kelly story.
- The former Shire Offices in Mair St, Benalla.
- The Kelly Gang camp site.
- Benalla Migrant Camp is listed on the Victorian Heritage Register.

== Demographics ==
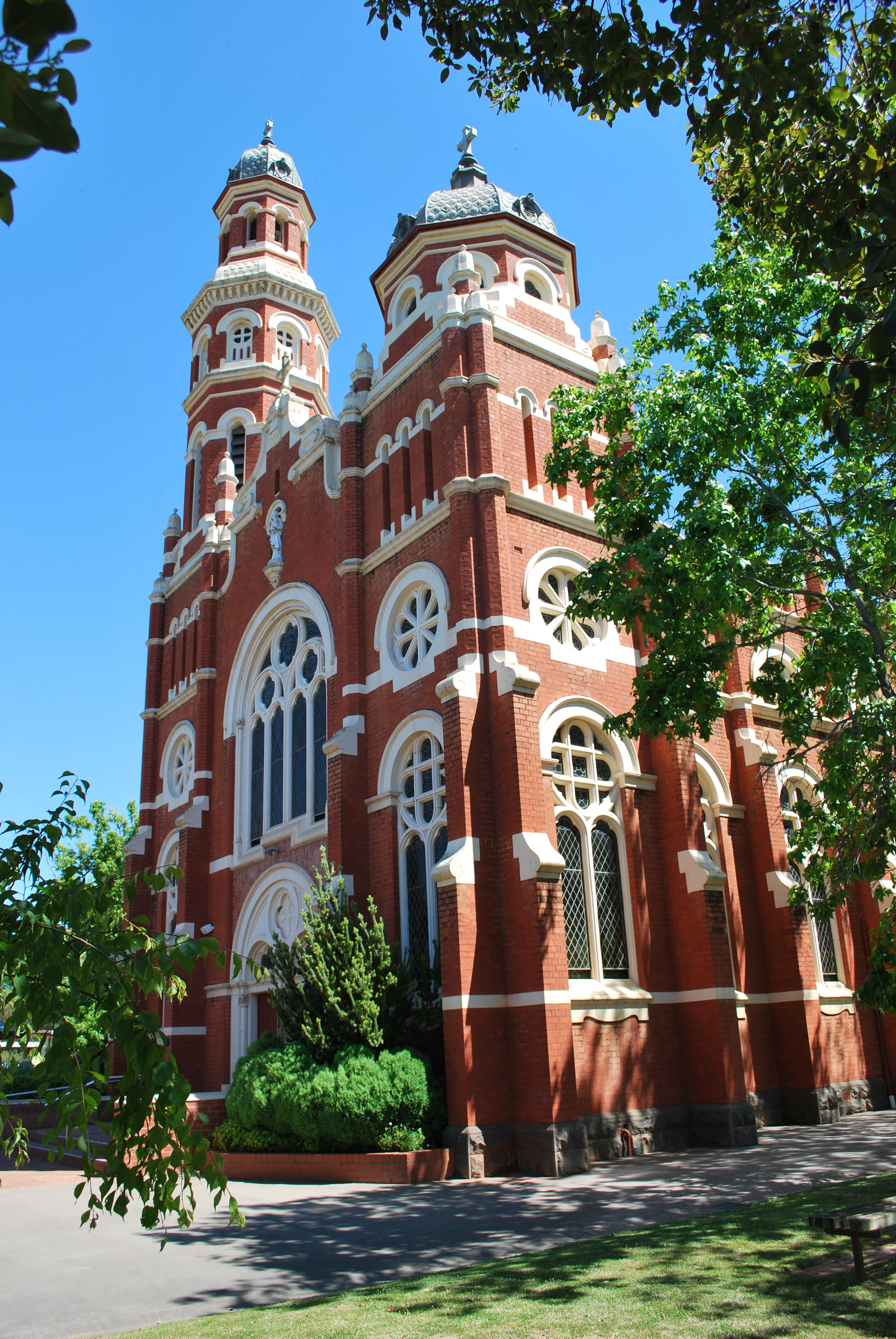
St Joseph's Roman Catholic Church

According to the 2021 census of Population, there were 9,316 people in Benalla.

- Aboriginal and Torres Strait Islander people made up 2.0% of the population.
- 81.4% of people were born in Australia. The next most common country of birth was England at 2.4%.
- 87.6% of people only spoke English at home.
- The most common responses for religion were No Religion 41.9%, Catholic 19.1% and Anglican 11.6%.

== Governance ==
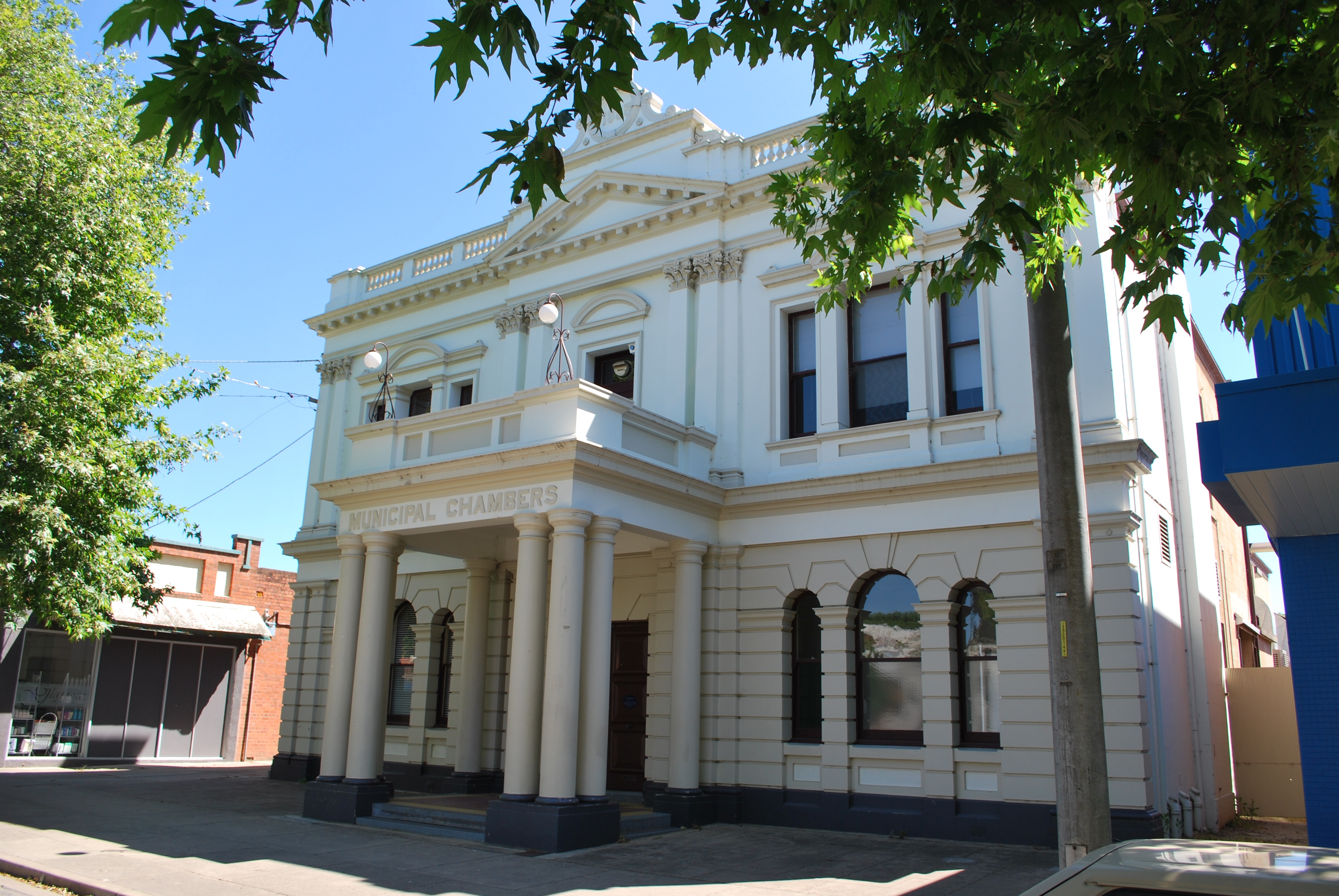
Benalla Town Hall

Benalla is the seat of local government and administrative headquarters for the Rural City of Benalla.

In the Victorian Legislative Assembly, it is represented by the Electoral district of Euroa.

In the Parliament of Australia, it is represented by the Division of Indi in the Australian House of Representatives.

== Economy ==
Industries include agricultural support services, tourism, a medium density fibreboard factory, Thales Australia ammunition factory and aviation.

As a service economy for the region, Benalla has many large retailers, including a Coles, Woolworths, Aldi and a Mitre 10 Home & Trade. Target Country on Bridge Street closed in April 2021.

== Education ==
Benalla has two secondary schools, Benalla P–12 College (which has four campuses comprising Prep–yr 2; yr 3–6; yrs 7–9 and 10–12), FCJ College and three primary schools: Benalla P–12, St Joseph's Primary School and Australian Christian College – Hume. McCristal's College was a private grammar school that used to exist in Benalla.

The Benalla Flexible Learning Centre offers an alternative education model for students up to 22 years old also.

The Goulburn Ovens Institute of TAFE has a campus in Benalla which includes the Benalla Performing Arts and Convention Centre opened in 2004 by Lynne Kosky MP, the then Minister of Education and Training. The campus included GRADA, a regional academy of dramatic art offering courses in Acting, Dance and Production and now specializes in Nursing and Engineering courses with direct links to local businesses for work placements. The other GoTafe campuses in the region include at Shepparton, Wangaratta and Seymour.

The Centre for Continuing Education also offers pre-employment programs in Benalla plus Aged Care programs with practical work experience at Cooinda Village.

== Media ==
Benalla has a local newspaper, the Benalla Ensign, which is published weekly.

== Healthcare ==
Health services are provided by Benalla Health, which operates a 42-bed hospital, plus a variety of Allied Health and maternal and Child Health Services.

== Transport ==
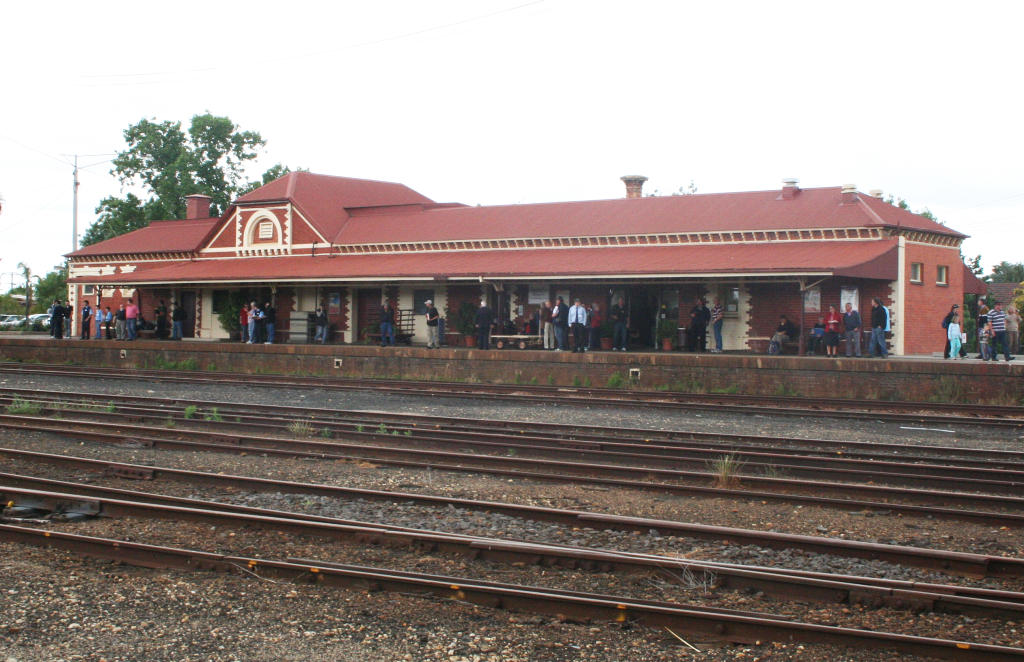
Benalla railway station

Benalla is a little over two hours from Melbourne by road or train. The Hume Freeway (National Highway M31) now by-passes Benalla to the south, while the Midland Highway (A300) runs through the city centre. Rail transport includes both passenger rail and freight. Benalla railway station is on the North East railway line, and three Albury V/Line rail services stop at Benalla daily, as does the twice-daily NSW TrainLink XPT service between Melbourne and Sydney.

Benalla Bus Lines runs a local service every hour on two routes, serving the west and east sides of the city. The main bus terminal is outside the ANZ Bank in Nunn Street.

Benalla Airport YBLA (BLN) began life as a major RAAF training base during World War II. It now also serves as the home of the Gliding Club of Victoria, as well as a ballooning and ultralight centre, and is the home of the Benalla Aviation Museum.

== Utilities ==
Water is supplied by North East Water. The main water supply is Loombah Weir and McCall Say Reservoir in the Ryan's Creek Catchment approximately 13 kilometres south of the city with a total 1800 megalitre capacity.

== Environmental issues ==
More than a hundred complaints were received by EPA Victoria from 2019 for the dust and particulates coming from Monsbent Pty Ltd, also known as D&R Henderson, situated in Yarrawonga road. The company was charged a fine of $80,000 in court in 2021 for failing to follow the requirements of its licence. In September 2022, EPA laid 39 new charges for breaching their licence conditions by emitting an excess in dust, odours and other nuisible substances.

== Notable residents ==
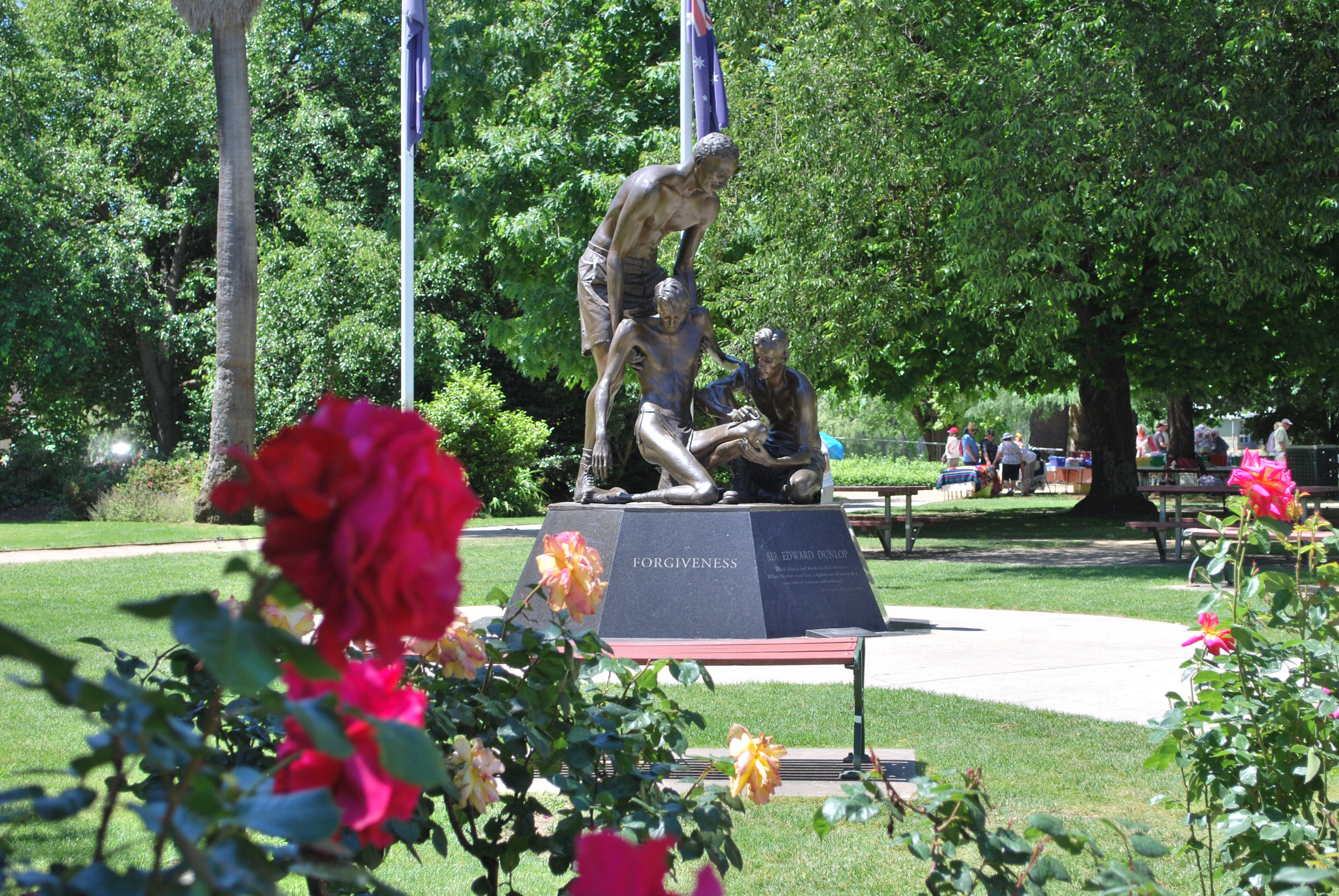
Sir Edward Dunlop Memorial at Benalla Botanical Gardens

- Prue Acton – fashion designer
- Henry Beardmore – politician
- Zak Best – racing driver
- John Brady – former VFL/AFL footballer – North Melbourne FC
- Eric Butler – political activist and journalist
- Greg Champion – musician
- Jack Cleary – Australian rules footballer
- Baden Cooke – Olympic cyclist, Commonwealth medalist and winner of Tour de France green jersey
- Frazer Dale – AFL footballer
- Arthur Drakeford Jr. – politician
- Tommy Dunderdale – ice hockey player, member of the Hockey Hall of Fame
- Edward "Weary" Dunlop – surgeon and World War II prisoner of war
- James Flynn – former VFL/AFL footballer – Geelong FC, Carlton FC
- Braddon Green – cricketer
- Shayne Greenman – baker
- Ian Hull – Australian rules footballer
- Graham Jacobs – politician
- Tom Long – actor
- James Mackinnon – politician
- Carole Marple – politician
- Bridget McKenzie – politician
- Herbert Milne – Australian rules footballer
- Harry Morrison – AFL footballer
- Graham Oppy – philosopher at Monash University
- Tony Plowman – politician
- Tom Rockliff – AFL footballer for Brisbane Lions FC
- Hugh Sawrey – artist
- Mark Seymour – lead singer of Hunters & Collectors and solo artist
- Nick Seymour – bass player in Crowded House
- Max Sharam – musician
- Robyn Smith – disability sport administrator
- Mark Soyer – paralympic skier
- Jaclyn Symes – Member for Northern Victoria in the Victorian State Parliament
- John Thompson – Australian rules footballer
- Tom Trewin – politician
- Hector Waller – captain of the light cruiser HMAS Perth in the Second World War
- David Williams – politician
- John George Winchester Wilmot – Assistant District Surveyor, Benalla, 1855–60.
