= Broken River (Victoria) =

River in Victoria, Australia

Broken Dareterkornong
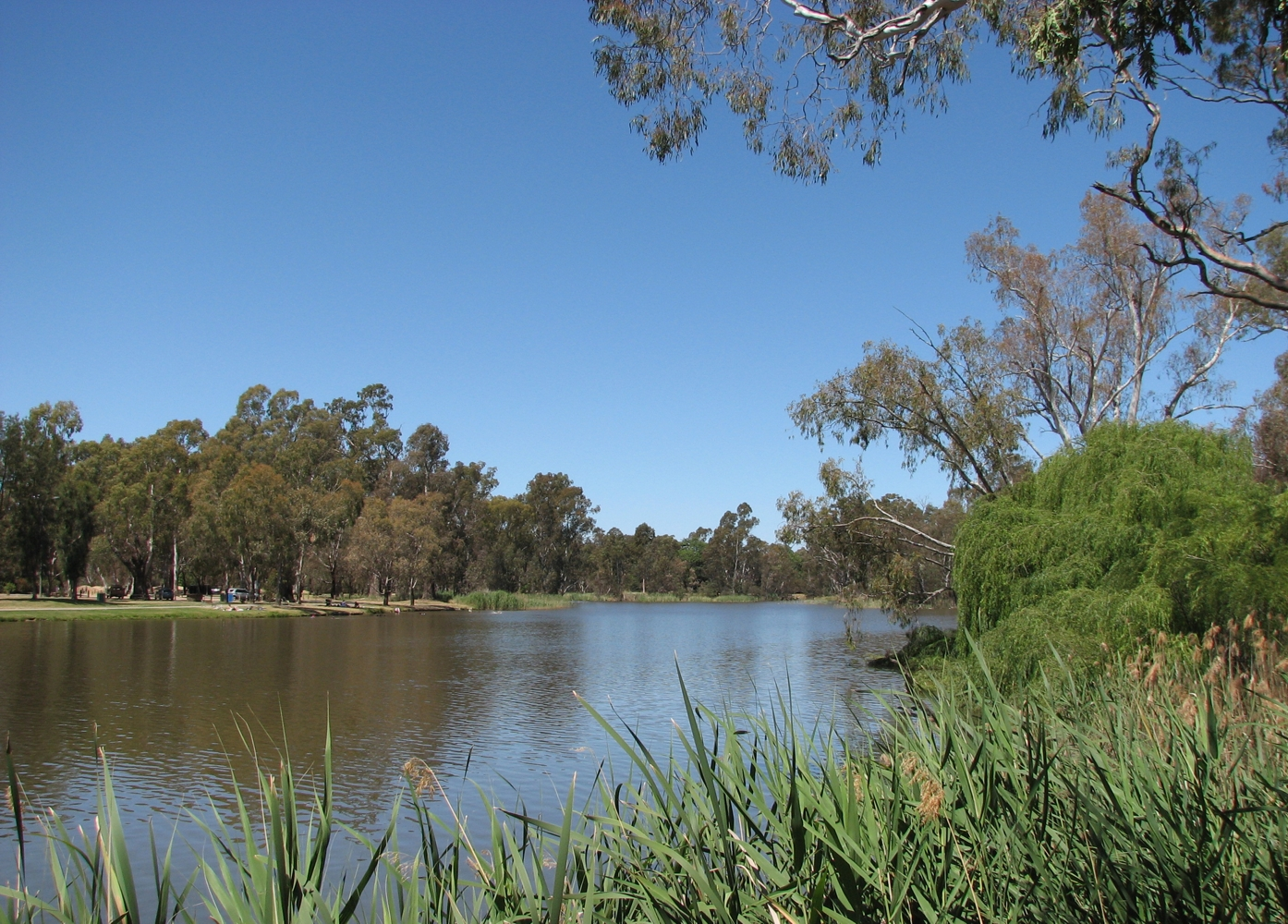
- A weir constructed across the Broken River formed Lake Benalla

- Course of the Broken River and also the Goulburn River in Victoria

Location
- Country: Australia
- State: Victoria
- Region: Alpine and Riverine bioregions (IBRA), Victorian Alps, Northern Country/North Central
- Local government areas: Mansfield, Benalla, Greater Shepparton
- Towns and cities: Benalla, Shepparton–Mooroopna

Physical characteristics
- Source: Victorian Alps, Great Dividing Range
  - location: near Bald Hill
  - coordinates: 36°44′03″S 146°19′20″E
  - elevation: 1,190 m (3,900 ft)
- Mouth: confluence with the Goulburn River
  - location: near Shepparton
  - coordinates: 36°23′39″S 145°23′3″E
  - elevation: 115 m (377 ft)
- Length: 225 km (140 mi)
- Discharge
  - average: 9 m^{3}/s (320 cu ft/s)

Basin features
- River system: Goulburn Broken catchment, Murray–Darling basin

The Broken River, a minor inland perennial river of the Goulburn Broken catchment, part of the Murray–Darling basin, is located in the Alpine and Northern Country/North Central regions of the Australian state of Victoria. The headwaters of the Broken River rise in the western slopes of the Victorian Alps, near Bald Hill and descend to flow into the Goulburn River near Shepparton. The river is impounded by the Nillahcootie Dam to create Lake Nillahcootie and Benalla Dam to create Lake Benalla.

== Location and features ==
The river rises below Bald Hill on the western slopes of the Victorian Alps, within the Shire of Mansfield. The river flow generally west, then north, then west passing through or adjacent to the regional cities of Benalla and Shepparton–Mooroopna, joined by ten minor tributaries, before reaching its confluence with the Goulburn River within Shepparton. The river descends 1,070 metres (3,510 ft) over its 225-kilometre (140 mi) course.

When at maximum capacity, the Broken River is the fastest flowing river in Australia.

The town of Benalla, located adjacent to the river, was known as Broken River into the 1850s. It was the location of the Battle of Broken River.

== Etymology ==
The local Indigenous Taungurung name for the river in its main section around Benalla was Dareterkornong.

The origin of the river's current name is originally thought to be derived from the fact that in dry seasons the river bed is broken into a series of water holes.

== See also ==
- List of rivers of Australia § Victoria
