= Jack Cleary (footballer, born 1911) =

Australian rules footballer, born 1911

Personal information
- Full name: John Joseph Cleary
- Born: 28 August 1911; Carlton, Victoria
- Died: 14 February 1995 (aged 83); Sydney
- Original team: Thornbury CYMS (CYMSFA)

Playing career^{1}
Years	Club	Games (Goals)
1932	Fitzroy	3 (0)
- ^{1} Playing statistics correct to the end of 1932.

John Joseph Cleary (28 August 1911 – 14 February 1995) was an Australian rules footballer who played with Fitzroy in the Victorian Football League (VFL).
