= Benalla Botanical Gardens =

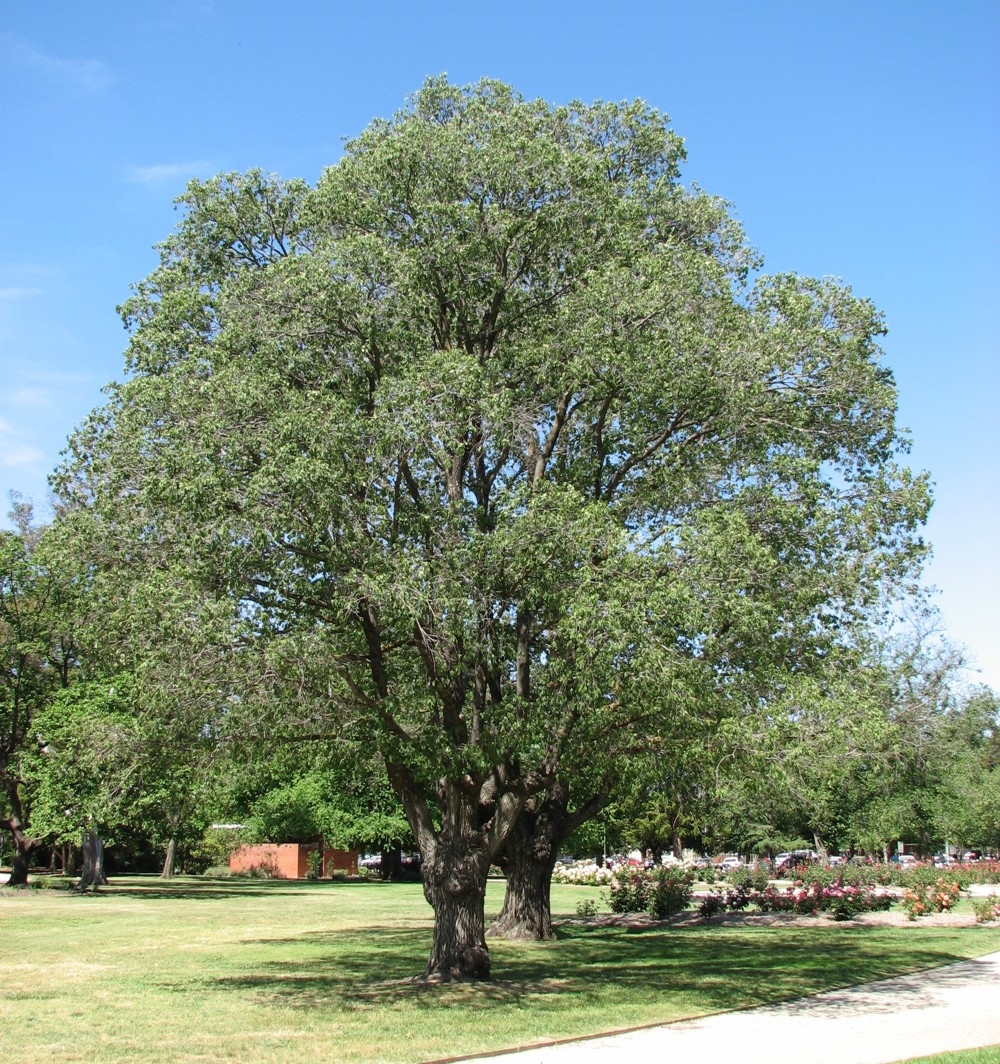
- Two pollarded specimens of Ulmus x viminalis, listed on the National Trust's significant tree register
- Interactive map of Benalla Botanical Gardens
- Type: Botanical
- Location: Benalla, Victoria
- Coordinates: 36°33′11.79″S 145°58′42.39″E
- Area: 5.1 hectares (13 acres)
- Opened: 1886
- Owner: Benalla Rural City Council
- Operator: Friends of Benalla Botanical Gardens & Riverine Parkland

The Benalla Botanic Gardens, is a heritage listed botanic garden located in Benalla, Victoria, Australia. The gardens, originally designed by Alfred Sangwell in 1886, was listed on the Register of the National Estate in 1995. The gardens include a rose garden established in 1959, which is the focus of the annual Benalla Rose Festival. Amongst the extensive mature tree collection are 3 specimens of Ulmus x viminalis which are the only specimens of this particular elm cultivar in Australia and are listed on the National Trust of Australia's significant tree register.
