= Jack Cleary (footballer, born 1922) =

Australian rules footballer

Personal information
- Full name: John Bernard Francis Cleary
- Born: 9 February 1922; Benalla, Victoria
- Died: 12 October 1981 (aged 59); Daylesford, Victoria
- Original team: RAAF
- Height: 183 cm (6 ft 0 in)
- Weight: 80 kg (176 lb)

Playing career^{1}
Years	Club	Games (Goals)
1945–46	Hawthorn	10 (4)
- ^{1} Playing statistics correct to the end of 1946.

John Bernard Francis Cleary (9 February 1922 – 12 October 1981) was an Australian rules footballer who played with Hawthorn in the Victorian Football League (VFL).
