= Goulburn–Murray Water =

- Goulburn–Murray Rural Water Corporation
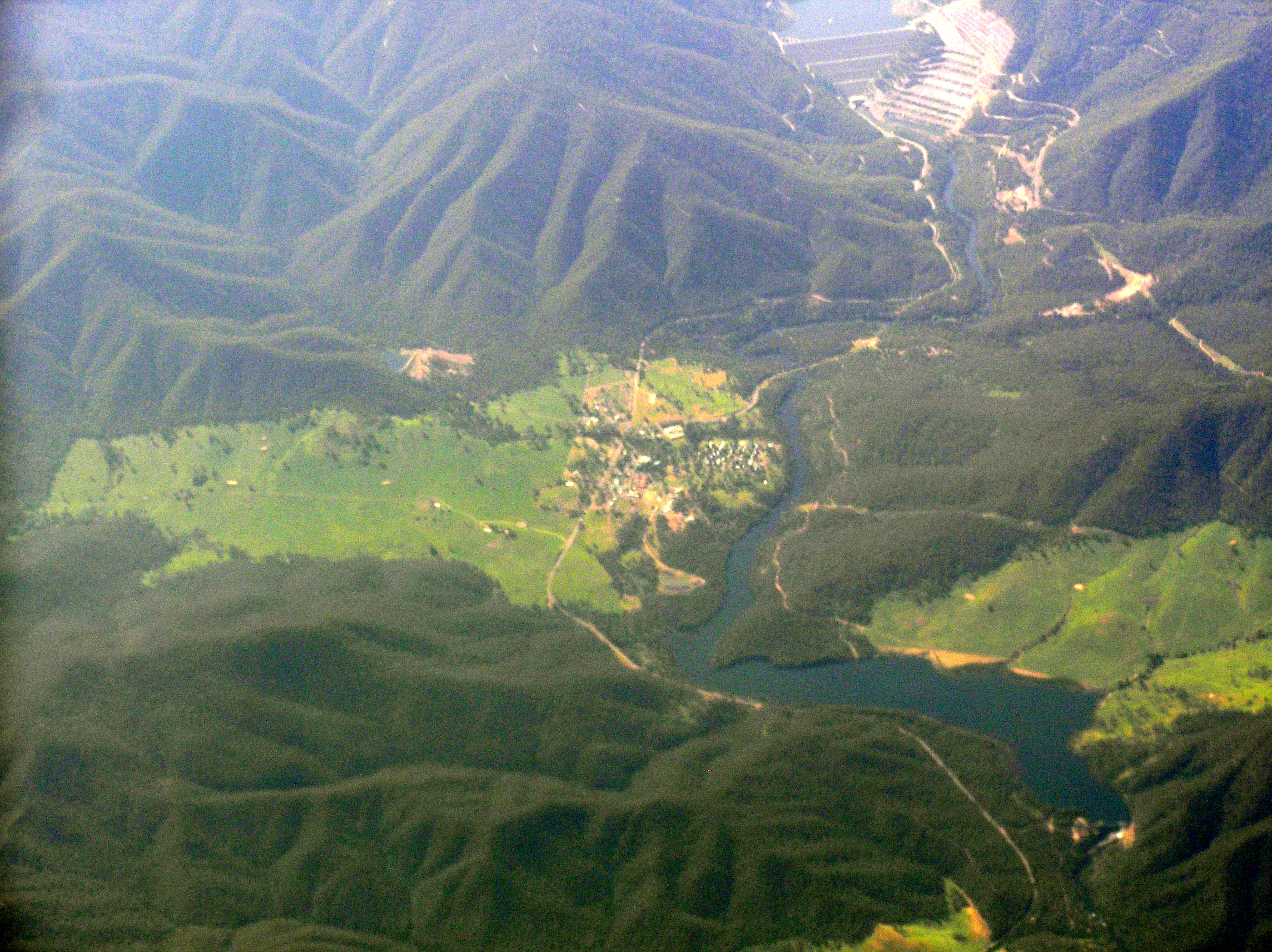
- Dartmouth Dam in the background, managed by Goulburn–Murray Water, with Dartmouth in the foreground.

Statutory authority overview
- Jurisdiction: Northern Victoria, Australia
- Employees: 688 FTE (2013)
- Annual budget: A$301 million (2013)
- Minister responsible: Harriet Shing, Minister for Water
- Statutory authority executive: CEO
- Parent department: Department of Environment, Land, Water and Planning
- Key document: Water Act 1989 (VIC)
- Website: www.g-mwater.com.au

Goulburn–Murray Water, the trading name of the Goulburn–Murray Rural Water Corporation, a statutory authority of the Victorian Government, provides bulk water storage and supply services to people of Northern Country/North Central Victoria and the Southern Riverina regions in Australia.

Established pursuant to the Water Act 1989 (VIC), Goulburn–Murray Water manages bulk water supplies to local government–owned water utilities, provides flood mitigation services, and manages the health of the Goulburn and Murray rivers catchment in northern Victoria. Goulburn–Murray Water also provides irrigation services to about 68,000 square kilometres (26,000 sq mi) stretching from the Great Dividing Range to the south, the Murray River to the north and stretching from Corryong in the east to Nyah.

Goulburn–Murray Water is managed by a managing director who reports to a Board of Management that are ultimately responsible to the Minister for Water, presently Harriet Shing. The Department of Environment, Land, Water and Planning provides administrative oversight of the statutory authority.

In 2011 it was reported that Goulburn–Murray Water had an operating shortfall of A$80 million in its budget.

== See also ==
- Murray-Darling Basin Authority
- Water security in Australia
- Water supply and sanitation in Australia
- Murray River
- Goulburn River
