= Bugger (disambiguation) =

Bugger is a slang expletive used in vernacular English. Bugger may also refer to:

- Buggers, a derogatory term for the Formics, an insectoid alien species in the Ender's Game series of novels
- Frito and Dildo Bugger, characters in Bored of the Rings, a parody of Lord of the Rings
- Bugger (advertising campaign), a 1999 advertising campaign for the Toyota Hilux

== See also ==
- Buggery, a legal term for unlawful anal sex
- Mount Buggery (Alpine Shire, Victoria), a mountain in the Australian state of Victoria
- Mount Buggery (Wangaratta, Victoria), a mountain in the Australian state of Victoria
