= Mount Buggery =

Mount Buggery may mean:

- Mount Buggery (Alpine Shire, Victoria)
- Mount Buggery (Wangaratta, Victoria)
