= Dandongadale River =

River in Victoria, Australia

Dandongadale Dondangadale
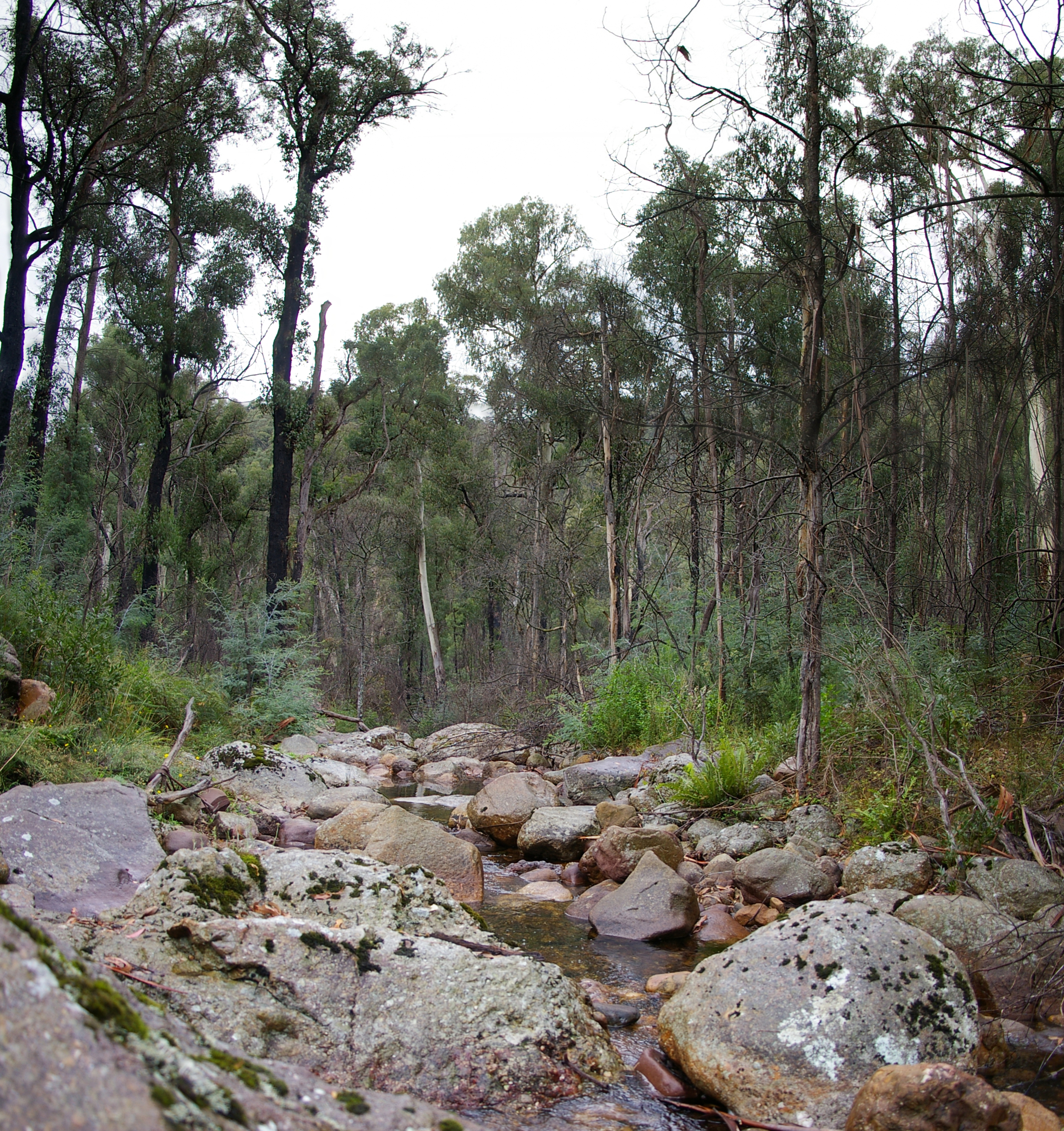
- Dandongadale River, en route to Mt Cobbler/Lake Cobbler.

- Location of the Dandongadale River mouth in Victoria

Location
- Country: Australia
- State: Victoria
- Region: Victorian Alps (IBRA), Victorian Alps
- Local government areas: Alpine Shire, Wangaratta

Physical characteristics
- Source: Alpine National Park, Victorian Alps
  - location: below Cobbler Plateau
  - coordinates: 37°0′52″S 146°39′26″E
  - elevation: 1,240 m (4,070 ft)
- Mouth: confluence with the Buffalo River
  - location: near Dandongadale
  - coordinates: 36°47′43″S 146°39′53″E
  - elevation: 280 m (920 ft)
- Length: 41 km (25 mi)

Basin features
- River system: North-East Murray catchment, Murray-Darling basin
- Tributaries
  - left: Rose River (Victoria)
- Waterfalls: Dandongadale Falls
- National parks: Alpine National Park, Mount Buffalo National Park

The Dandongadale River, a perennial river of the North-East Murray catchment of the Murray-Darling basin, is located in the Alpine region of Victoria, Australia. It flows from the northern slopes of the Alpine National Park in the Australian Alps, joining with the Buffalo River in remote national park territory.

== Location and features ==
The Dandongadale River rises below the Cobbler Plateau, west of the Barry Mountains and to the east of Mount Buller, at an elevation exceeding 1,240 metres (4,070 ft) above sea level. The river flows generally north by east all of its course through the remote national park, joined by the Rose River, before reaching its confluence with the Buffalo River within the Mount Buffalo National Park. The river descends 959 metres (3,146 ft) over its 41-kilometre (25 mi) course.

Near its source, the river is impounded by the naturally forming 5-hectare (12-acre) Lake Cobbler. From the lake, the river spills over the Dandongadale Falls, the highest waterfall in Victoria, descending 255 metres (837 ft) over successive cascades in a series of significant drops, culminating in the final drop over the Cobbler Plateau. Camping and hiking facilities are located in the area.

== See also ==
- List of rivers of Australia § Victoria
