= Shaggy pea =

Shaggy pea is a common name for several plants and may refer to:

- Oxylobium, a genus of flowering plants native to Australia
- Podolobium, a genus of flowering plants native to eastern Australia
