= Ghost Chips =

2011 public service announcement

- The "ghost chips" scene from the advertisement
- Agency: Clemenger BBDO
- Client: NZ Transport Agency
- Running time: 1 minute
- Release date: 23 October 2011
- Slogan: Stop a mate driving drunk, bloody legend.
- Directed by: Steve Ayson
- Music by: Mahuia Bridgman-Cooper
- Starring: Darcey-Ray Flavell-Hudson
- Production company: The Sweet Shop
- Country: New Zealand

Legend, popularly known as Ghost Chips, is a 2011 public service announcement by the NZ Transport Agency (NZTA) to prevent drink driving. Targeting young Māori men, a demographic with a high rate of drink driving incidents, the advertisement targeted bystanders who could prevent peers from driving drunk. Its comedic tone contrasted with campaigns that used graphic imagery. The film depicts the internal monologue of a young man (portrayed by Darcey-Ray Flavell-Hudson) who is unsure whether to tell his friend not to drive drunk but imagines the consequences of not doing so, including his friend becoming a ghost. The advertisement went viral, and received praise for its humour and realism. It became a New Zealand cultural icon and meme, inspiring multiple catchphrases. The NZTA reported in 2012 that over 90% of people in the country knew of the advertisement.

== Synopsis ==
External videos
- Legend (Ghost Chips), via NZ On Screen

The advertisement is presented through the internal monologue of its protagonist, a Māori young man at a party, who is unsure whether to tell his friend George not to drive drunk. He worries that he may make himself look dumb if he speaks. However, he considers that if George gets in an accident, he may have to live with George's family. He also imagines that George may die and become a ghost, haunting him by offering him "ghost chips" that the corporeal protagonist cannot eat. The protagonist ultimately decides to stop George from driving drunk, telling him, "crash here!" The advertisement ends with a voiceover saying, "Stop a mate from driving drunk. Legend."

== Production and release ==
The NZ Transport Agency (NZTA) had run a public service announcement campaign about drink driving since the mid-1990s. NZTA's principal advisor Rachel Prince said that the agency worked to identify a target audience for messaging that would reduce drink driving. Young men had a high risk of drink driving, comprising 82% of serious or fatal drink driving crashes between 2008 and 2010. The rate was particularly high among Māori men, with Māori comprising 38% of such incidents during this period. Prince spoke with focus groups and found that young men avoided intervening with friends who drove drunk out of fear of awkwardness, so she aimed for messaging that shifted awkwardness to humour. NZTA shifted the focus of its messaging toward bystanders who may prevent their friends from drink driving.

NZTA created Ghost Chips in collaboration with marketing communications agency Clemenger BBDO and production studio The Sweet Shop. Four concepts created by Clemenger BBDO were combined into the final advertisement after test screenings. Unlike other NZTA campaigns, which had used graphic imagery, Ghost Chips was a comedy. The agency explained, "We want them to have the guts to speak up and say something without feeling like they've killed the mood. We need to break through this barrier and the use of humour is key to achieving this successfully." NZTA's manager of communications, Lauren Cooke, said a comedic advertisement was created to contrast with the graphic advertisements, which audiences were already familiar with.

The protagonist was played by Darcey-Ray Flavell-Hudson, who had gained recognition from his role in the 2010 Taika Waititi film Boy. Flavell-Hudson later recalled that he had initially considered the script "over the top". Eleven-year-old Cameron Carter-Chan was initially cast in a non-speaking role, but, as the script was edited to be more comedic, he was given the line "Puzzle time!" The film's editing blurs the backgrounds of some scenes, which emphasises the main characters. The music consists of a drum beat during the opening party scene and again during the ending.

Ghost Chips was aired as part of the Legend campaign of public service announcements, which had first been announced in 2006. The campaign also included advertisements on radio, billboards, and at bars. Along with airing on television, the Ghost Chips advertisement was posted on YouTube on 23 October 2011, receiving over 100,000 views within six days and over one million views within two weeks. It was the year's fifth-most viewed advertisement on YouTube in Australia. It also went viral on Facebook, and a Facebook page whose only post was the video received 25,000 likes by November 2011. NZTA media manager Andy Knackstedt said in November 2011 that it was the fastest-growing advertisement in New Zealand.

== Reception and analysis ==
Ghost Chips was praised by viewers within the target demographic and media professionals for its humour, relatability, and realistic dialogue. It was positively received by YouTube viewers, with commenters praising it for being unlike public service announcements that used graphic imagery. It won the TVC of the Year award at the 2012 AXIS Awards, as well as the Yellow Pencil in the Integrated and Earned Media category at the 2012 D&AD Awards. Writing for Stuff magazine, Lucy Zee and Emily Brookes praised the advertisement for its "surreal twists and turns", crediting its script and its colourful, dynamic cinematography. In a 2016 reader poll by The New Zealand Herald, Ghost Chips was voted the best television advertisement in New Zealand, narrowly beating the 1999 bugger commercial for the Toyota Hilux.

Radio New Zealand's Elle Hunt contrasted the Legend campaign's use of the slogan "Bloody legend" with a previous NZTA campaign with the slogan "Bloody idiot", shifting the focus from discouragement of drunk drivers to encouragement of bystanders. According to an article in the International Journal of Drug Policy, Ghost Chips incorporates elements of friendship and drinking culture to make its point. Marketing professor Nick Ashill stated that the advertisement's success resulted from its comedic reproducibility.

According to media scholar Matthew Bannister, Ghost Chips is an example of advertising featuring Māori (as well as Pasifika) men with fantastical imagery, comparing it to another driving under the influence–themed PSA, Blazed, directed by Taika Waititi. Bannister also writes that advertisements such as Ghost Chips present a stereotype of these groups as more emotionally expressive than White men. Media scholars Khairiah A. Rahman and Deepti Bhargava write that Ghost Chips positively employs stereotypes of Māori men as funny—having received input from the demographic—while actively avoiding Māori stereotypes present in other advertisements, such as stupidity. Rahman and Bhargava state that the narrative, characters, and setting were written to be relatable to this target demographic, strengthening the persuasive appeal.

== Impact ==
Ghost Chips became a popular culture icon in New Zealand, inspiring memes, parodies, and t-shirts. Several quotations, including "You know I can't eat your ghost chips, bro", "Puzzle time!", and "I've been internalising a really complicated situation in my head" became popular and recognised to convey anti–drink driving messaging. For example, in 2012, police officers created and distributed wristbands with the words "ghost chips", and in 2022, a group of high school students in Christchurch began selling air fresheners with that same phrase. The advertisement received coverage in television programmes such as 7 Days and Jono and Ben at Ten. It also inspired the 2011 song "Ghost Chips" by the New Zealand hip-hop group The Cuzzies. According to Stuff, the advertisement was the inspiration for a joke in Taika Waititi's film Thor: Ragnarok, with a character saying the line, "Piss off ghost!"

Flavell-Hudson gained fame for starring in Ghost Chips. His former school in Rotorua installed a billboard featuring him, which was unveiled in a 2012 ceremony featuring Flavell-Hudson as well as politicians Simon Bridges and Todd McClay. His Ghost Chips role led to him being cast in the film Mt. Zion. In 2016, Flavell-Hudson—who occasionally continued acting but had a job as a builder—told Stuff that he continued to be recognised as "the ghost chips fella". Carter-Chan similarly told Stuff in 2012 that he was recognised as "the puzzle time guy". Flavell-Hudson was one of several stars of New Zealand advertisements to make an appearance at the 2019 New Zealand Media Awards.

A study by NZTA, published in The New Zealand Herald in October 2012, found that over 90% of New Zealanders recognised the advertisement, and about 75% considered it likely to prevent them from driving drunk, going beyond the target demographic of Māori young men and exceeding the reach of other NZTA campaigns. Some people credited the advertisement with a decline in road deaths. However, Prince told Radio New Zealand in 2014 that it was impossible to determine the campaign's direct impact, saying, "We're just one of the cogs in the machine."

== See also ==
- Cow (public service announcement)
- Embrace Life
- New Zealand humour
