= Rose River (Victoria) =

River in Australia

Rose
- Location of the Rose River mouth in Victoria

Location
- Country: Australia
- State: Victoria
- Region: Victorian Alps (IBRA), Victorian Alps
- Local government areas: Alpine Shire, Wangaratta

Physical characteristics
- Source: Cobbler Plateau, Victorian Alps
  - location: below Mount Cobbler
  - coordinates: 36°59′54″S 146°30′59″E
  - elevation: 1,030 m (3,380 ft)
- Mouth: confluence with the Dandongadale River
  - location: near Dandongadale
  - coordinates: 36°48′19″S 146°37′53″E
  - elevation: 298 m (978 ft)
- Length: 41 km (25 mi)

Basin features
- River system: North-East Murray catchment, Murray–Darling basin
- National park: Mount Buffalo National Park

The Rose River, a perennial river of the North-East Murray catchment of the Murray–Darling basin, is located in the Alpine region of Victoria, Australia. It flows from the northern slopes of the Mount Buffalo National Park in the Australian Alps, joining with the Dandongadale River in remote national park territory.

== Location and features ==
The Rose River rises below Mount Cobbler, west of the Cobbler Plateau and the Barry Mountains, at an elevation exceeding 1,000 metres (3,300 ft) above sea level. The river flows generally north by east, most of its course through the remote national park before reaching its confluence with the Dandongadale River within the Mount Buffalo National Park. The river descends 730 metres (2,400 ft) over its 41-kilometre (25 mi) course.

== See also ==
- List of rivers of Australia § Victoria
