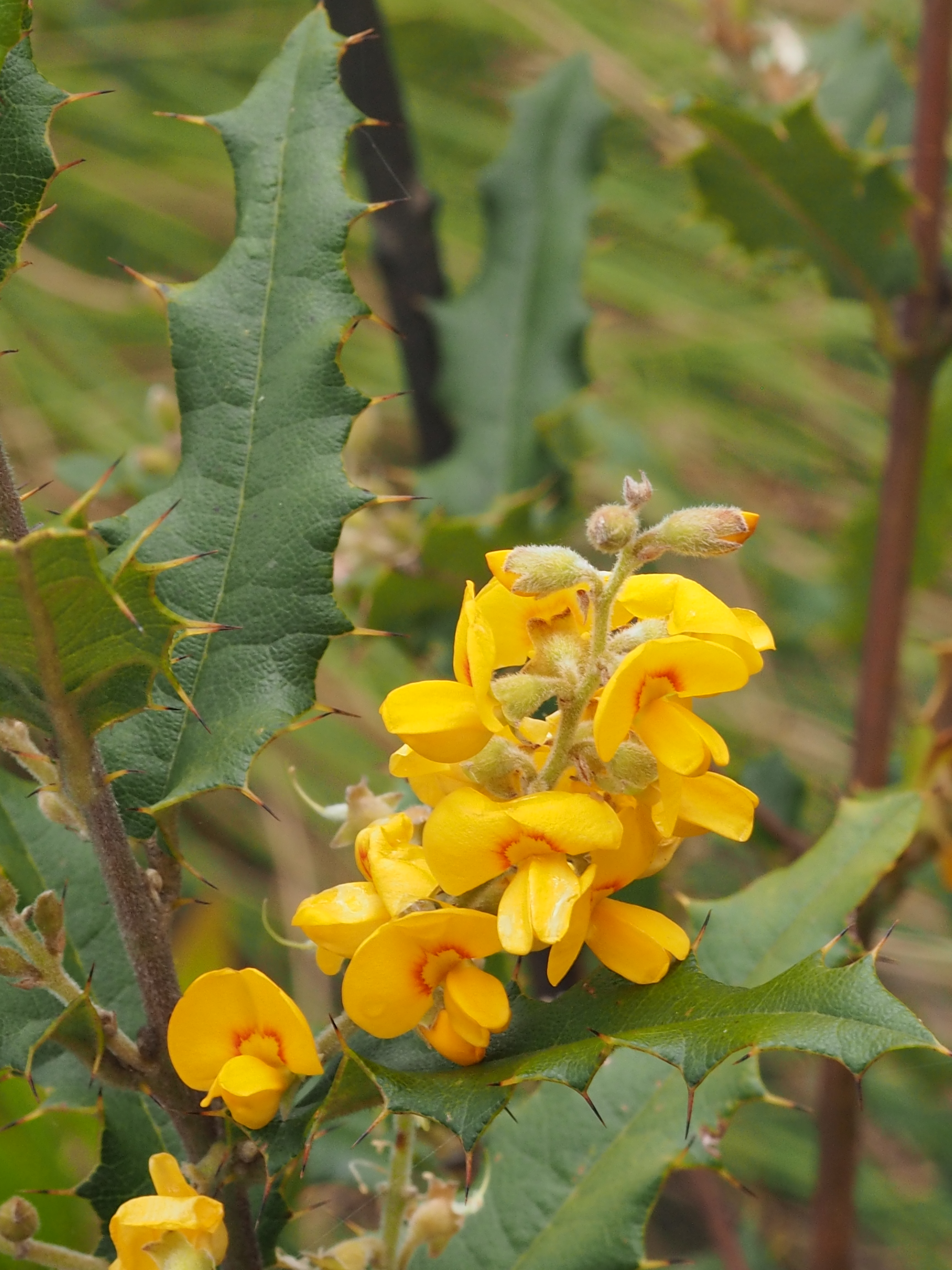
- In the Gibraltar Range National Park

Scientific classification
- Kingdom: Plantae
- Clade: Tracheophytes
- Clade: Angiosperms
- Clade: Eudicots
- Clade: Rosids
- Order: Fabales
- Family: Fabaceae
- Subfamily: Faboideae
- Genus: Podolobium
- Species: P. aestivum

Binomial name
- Podolobium aestivum Crisp & P.H.Weston

Synonyms
- Oxylobium trilobum var. ilicifolium Maiden & Betche

= Podolobium aestivum =

Species of legume

Podolobium aestivum, is a flowering plant in the family Fabaceae and is endemic to New South Wales, Australia. It is an upright shrub with green spiky leaves and orange pea-like flowers.

== Description ==
Podolobium aestivum is an upright shrub 1–2.5 m (3 ft 3 in – 8 ft 2 in) high, lower leaf surface and young stems covered with flattened or spreading hairs. The leaves are arranged opposite, usually 2.5–8 cm (0.98–3.15 in) long, 10–20 mm (0.39–0.79 in) wide, upper surface shiny and veined, margins more or less evenly lobed and sharply pointed. The stipules are stiff, sharp, curved, and up to 3 mm (0.12 in) long. The flowers are borne in racemes in leaf axils, occasionally longer than the leaves, bracts are oval-shaped and small. The orange corolla is about 10 mm (0.39 in) long and the calyx about 6 mm (0.24 in) long. Flowering occurs in spring and summer, and the fruit is an oblong shaped pod, more or less straight, 10–14 mm (0.39–0.55 in) long, about 3 mm (0.12 in) in diameter with short, soft hairs.

== Taxonomy and naming ==
Podolobium aestivum was first formally described in 1995 by Michael Crisp and Peter Henry Weston and the description was published Advances in Legume Systematics. The specific epithet (aestivum) means "pertaining to summer, and refers to the main flowering period".

== Distribution and habitat ==
This podolobium grows on rocky locations in sclerophyll forest in the Gibraltar Range and on Mount Warning in New South Wales.
