= Catherine River (Victoria) =

Catherine
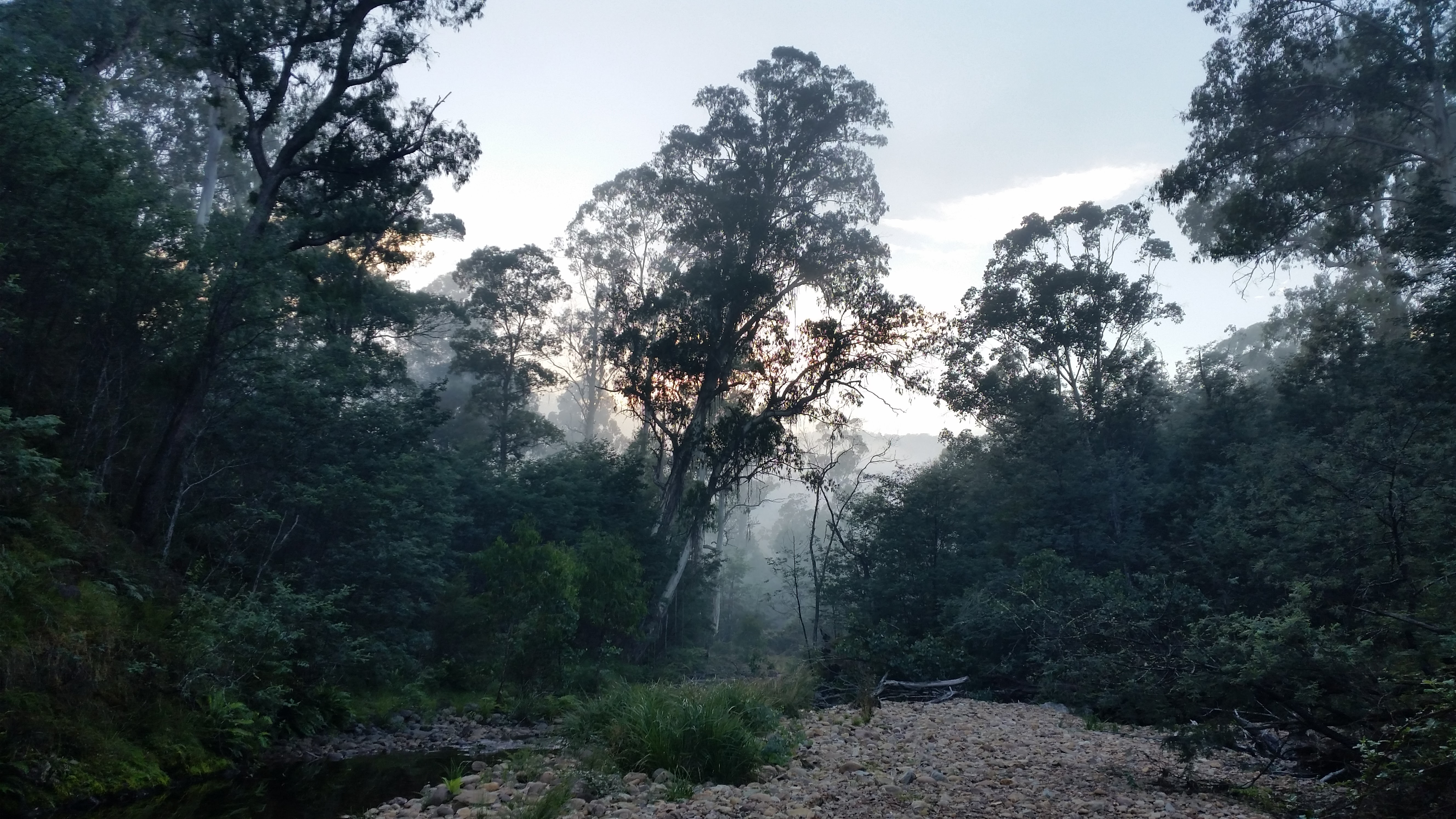
- Sunrise over a rocky bank, halfway down the Catherine River

- Location of the Catherine River mouth in Victoria

Location
- Country: Australia
- State: Victoria
- Region: Victorian Alps (IBRA), Victorian Alps
- Local government area: Alpine Shire

Physical characteristics
- Source: Alpine National Park, Victorian Alps
  - location: below Mount Speculation
  - coordinates: 37°7′24″S 146°38′55″E
  - elevation: 1,560 m (5,120 ft)
- Mouth: confluence with the Buffalo River
  - location: within the Mount Buffalo National Park
  - coordinates: 36°57′36″S 146°45′3″E
  - elevation: 392 m (1,286 ft)
- Length: 25 km (16 mi)

Basin features
- River system: North-East Murray catchment, Murray–Darling basin
- National parks: Alpine National Park, Mount Buffalo National Park

The Catherine River, a perennial river of the North-East Murray catchment of the Murray–Darling basin, is located in the Alpine region of Victoria, Australia. It flows northwards in the Alpine National Park in the Australian Alps, joining with the Buffalo River in remote national park territory.

== Location and features ==
The Catherine River rises below Mount Speculation, west of the Barry Mountains and to the east of Mount Buller, at an elevation exceeding 1,560 metres (5,120 ft) above sea level. The river flows generally north by east, all of its course through the remote national park before reaching its confluence with the Buffalo River within the Mount Buffalo National Park. The river descends 1,170 metres (3,840 ft) over its 25-kilometre (16 mi) course.

== See also ==
- List of rivers of Australia § Victoria
