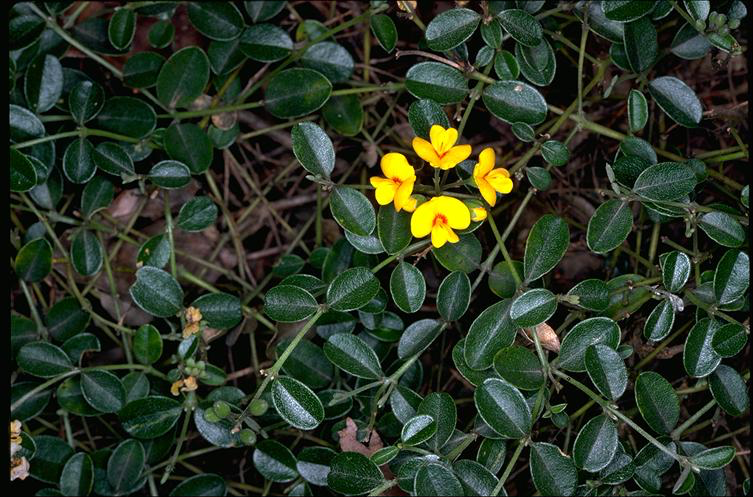

Scientific classification
- Kingdom: Plantae
- Clade: Tracheophytes
- Clade: Angiosperms
- Clade: Eudicots
- Clade: Rosids
- Order: Fabales
- Family: Fabaceae
- Subfamily: Faboideae
- Genus: Podolobium
- Species: P. scandens

Binomial name
- Podolobium scandens (Sm.) DC.

Synonyms
- Daviesia umbellata DC.

= Podolobium scandens =

Netted shaggy-pea

Species of legume

Podolobium scandens, commonly known as netted shaggy-pea, is a flowering plant in the family Fabaceae and is endemic to eastern Australia. It is a prostrate, small shrub with orange-yellow pea-like flowers and red markings.

== Description ==
Podolobium scandens is a low, spreading, prostrate shrub with branches sometimes up to 60 cm (24 in) long. The leaves are mostly arranged opposite, oval to egg-shaped to elliptic, 1–7 cm (0.39–2.76 in) long, 5–25 mm (0.20–0.98 in) wide, margins more or less finely scalloped, upper surface dark green, shiny and veined, lower surface paler with occasional hairs, apex either sharp, rounded or notched. The flowers are borne in racemes in leaf axils or at the end of branches, the corolla about 10 mm (0.39 in) long, orange or yellow with brown reddish markings. Flowering occurs in spring to summer and the fruit is an egg-shaped pod 10–15 mm (0.39–0.59 in) long with soft, short hairs.

== Taxonomy and naming ==
The species was first described in 1805 by James Edward Smith and given the name Chorizema scandens. In 1825 Augustin Pyramus de Candolle changed the name to Podolobium scandens and the description was published in Prodromus Systematis Naturalis Regni Vegetabilis.

== Distribution and habitat ==
Netted shaggy-pea grows in rocky clay soils in sclerophyll forests on ranges and coastal situations north of Bodalla in New South Wales.
