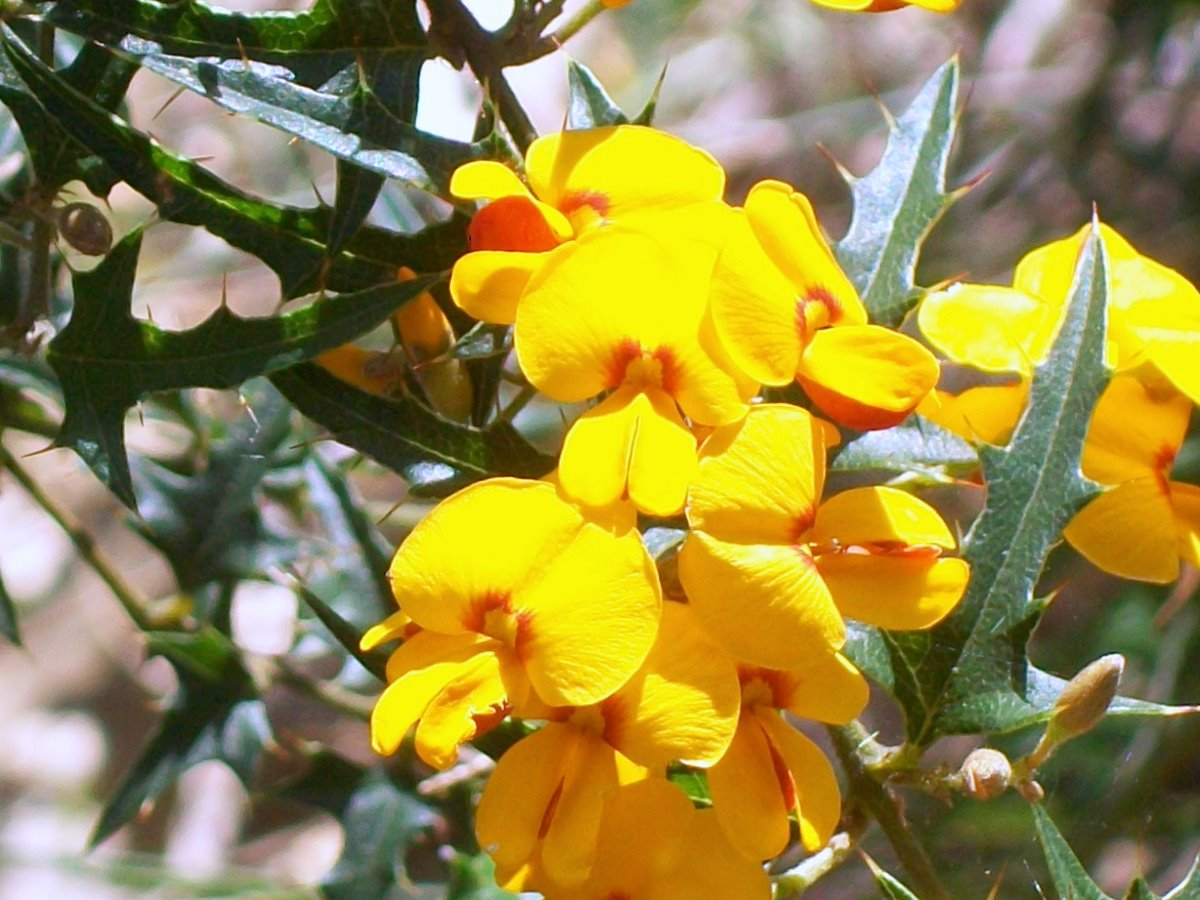
- Podolobium ilicifolium at Ku-ring-gai Chase National Park

Conservation status
- Least Concern (IUCN 3.1)

Scientific classification
- Kingdom: Plantae
- Clade: Tracheophytes
- Clade: Angiosperms
- Clade: Eudicots
- Clade: Rosids
- Order: Fabales
- Family: Fabaceae
- Subfamily: Faboideae
- Genus: Podolobium
- Species: P. ilicifolium

Binomial name
- Podolobium ilicifolium (Andrews) Crisp & P.H.Weston

Synonyms
- List: Callistachys ilicifolia (Andrews) Kuntze; Callistachys staurophylla (Sieber ex DC.) Kuntze; Chorizema trilobatum Aiton orth. var.; Chorizema trilobum Sm.; Oxylobium ilicifolium (Andrews) Domin; Oxylobium staurophyllum (Sieber ex DC.) Benth.; Oxylobium trilobatum Benth. orth. var.; Oxylobium trilobatum var. staurophyllum Maiden & Betche; Oxylobium trilobum (Sm.) Benth. nom. illeg.; Oxylobium trilobum var. ilicifolium Maiden & Betche; Oxylobium trilobum var. staurophyllum (Sieber ex DC.) Maiden & Betche; Podolobium aquifolium G.Don nom. inval., pro syn.; Podolobium aquifolium Hereman nom. inval., pro syn.; Podolobium berberifolium A.Cunn. ex Lindl.; Podolobium bidwellianum J.W.Loudon nom. inval., nom. nud.; Podolobium staurophyllum Sieber ex DC.; Podolobium trilobatum R.Br. orth. var.; Podolobium trilobatum var. bidwelliana Loudon nom. inval., pro syn.; Podolobium trilobum (Sm.) R.Br. nom. illeg., nom. superfl.; Pultenaea ilicifolia Andrews

= Podolobium ilicifolium =

Species of legume

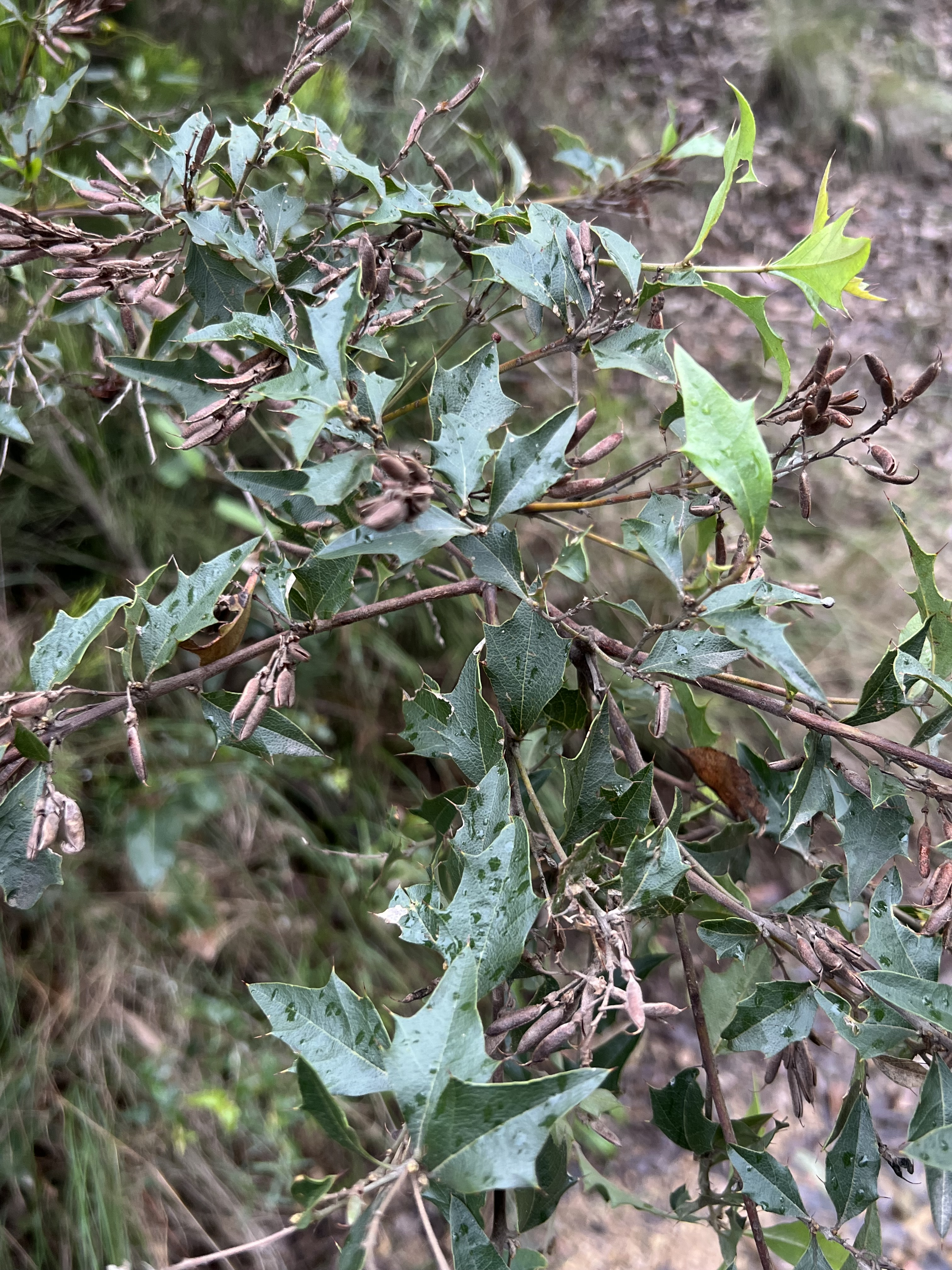
Foliage and fruit

Podolobium ilicifolium, commonly known as prickly shaggy-pea, is a flowering plant in the family Fabaceae and grows in eastern and southern Australia. The inflorescence is a cluster of yellow or orange pea-like flowers with red markings and shiny green, prickly foliage.

== Description ==
Podolobium ilicifolium is an upright shrub to 3 m (9.8 ft) high with more or less smooth or soft hairy stems. The leaves are arranged opposite or nearly so, oval to narrowly oval shaped, 2–10 cm (0.79–3.94 in) long and 10–30 mm (0.39–1.18 in) wide, upper surface smooth, distinctly veined, shiny, lower surface sometimes with soft hairs, margins lobed with a sharp point, on a petiole about 3 mm (0.12 in) long. The inflorescences are borne in leaf axils or at the end of branches on a pedicel 1–3 mm (0.039–0.118 in) long. The corolla is 8–10 mm (0.31–0.39 in) long, standard petal yellow or yellowish-orange with a reddish centre, wings yellowish, and the keel is red. Flowering occurs from spring to early summer and the fruit is an oval or oblong pod about 10 mm (0.39 in) long and 2–3 mm (0.079–0.118 in) in diameter, and may be curved or straight.

== Taxonomy and naming ==
Podolobium ilicifolium was first formally described in 1995 by Michael Crisp and Peter Weston and the description was published in Advances in Legume Systematics. The specific epithet (ilicifolium) means "holly leaved ".

== Distribution and habitat ==
Prickly shaggy-pea is a common plant, found in dry or moist sclerophyll forest, often on clay or sandstone based soils in New South Wales, Queensland and Victoria.
