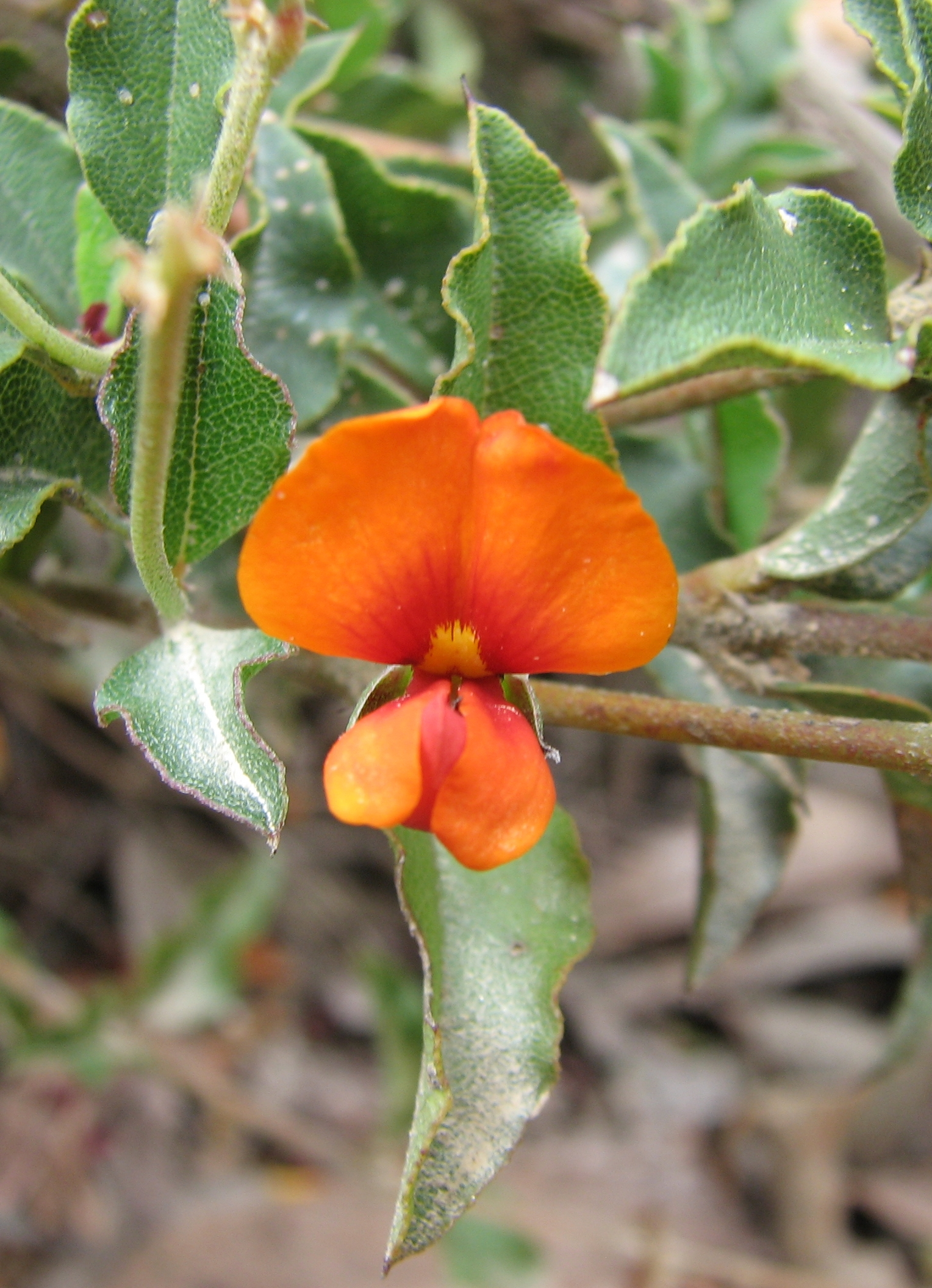
- Podolobium procumbens in Castlemaine Diggings National Heritage Park

Scientific classification
- Kingdom: Plantae
- Clade: Tracheophytes
- Clade: Angiosperms
- Clade: Eudicots
- Clade: Rosids
- Order: Fabales
- Family: Fabaceae
- Subfamily: Faboideae
- Genus: Podolobium
- Species: P. procumbens

Binomial name
- Podolobium procumbens (F.Muell.) F.Muell. ex Crisp & P.H.Weston

Synonyms
- Callistachys procumbens (F.Muell.) Kuntze; Oxylobium procumbens F.Muell.; Oxylobium procumbens F.Muell. isonym; Podolobium procumbens F.Muell. nom. inval., nom. nud.

= Podolobium procumbens =

Trailing shaggy-pea

Species of legume

Podolobium procumbens, commonly known as trailing shaggy-pea, trailing podolobium or trailing oxylobium, is a flowering plant in the family Fabaceae and is endemic to south-eastern Australia. It is a trailing small shrub with oval-shaped leaves and orange pea-like flowers.

== Description ==
Podolobium procumbens is a low, spreading shrub to 0.3 m (1 ft 0 in) tall with smooth stems and forms a lignotuber. The leaves may be arranged opposite or in whorls, oval-shaped, 1–2.5 cm (0.39–0.98 in) long, 6–18 mm (0.24–0.71 in) wide, upper surface smooth, wavy, shiny and veined, lower surface with occasional hairs, pointed at the apex on a petiole 3 mm (0.12 in) long. The inflorescence are in small clusters at the end of branches or in leaf axils on a silky pedicel 4–10 mm (0.16–0.39 in) long. The bracteoles are narrow lance-shaped, the calyx 6–9 mm (0.24–0.35 in) long with flattened, soft, short hairs. The corolla 10–14 mm (0.39–0.55 in) long, orange with red markings, the standard petal almost orb-shaped, orange with a red centre, the wings orange, and the keel is reddish. Flowering occurs from November to January and the fruit is an oblong pod, 10–15 mm (0.39–0.59 in) long, either straight or curved, and covered with long, straight, soft hairs.

== Taxonomy and naming ==
Trailing shaggy-pea was first formally described in 1855 by botanist Ferdinand von Mueller who gave it the name Oxylobium procumbens in Definitions of rare or hitherto undescribed Australian plants. In 1995 Michael Crisp and Peter Henry Weston changed the name to Podolobium procumbens and the change was published in Advances in Legume Systematics. The specific epithet (procumbens) means "procumbent".

Ferdinand von Mueller had previously published the name Podolobium procumbens in a report to the Victorian Government in 1853, but the name was not validly published because it was a nomen nudum, that is, there was no Latin description.

== Distribution and habitat ==
Trailing shaggy-pea occurs in sclerophyll forests and woodland in Victoria and south-eastern New South Wales.
