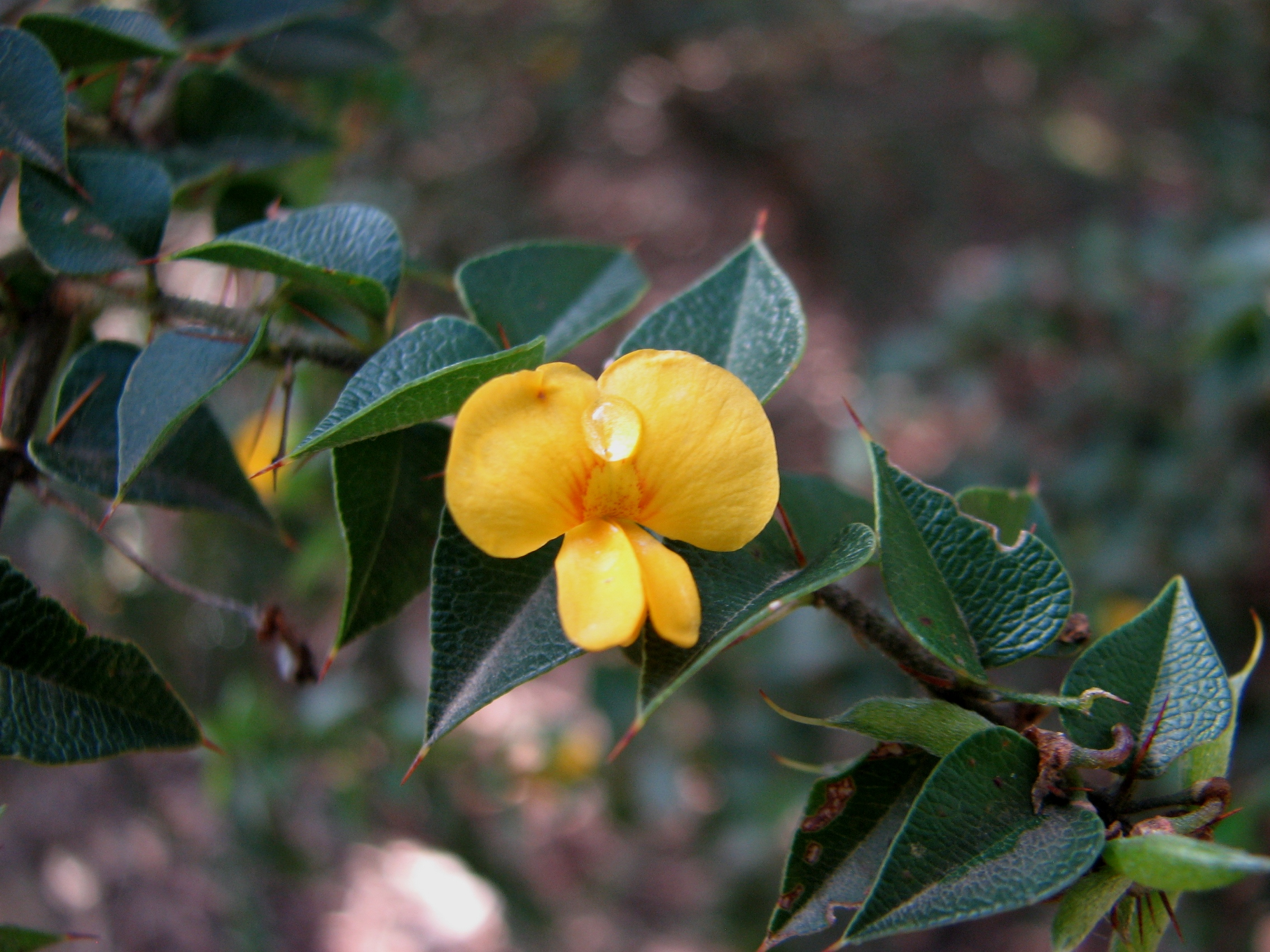

Scientific classification
- Kingdom: Plantae
- Clade: Tracheophytes
- Clade: Angiosperms
- Clade: Eudicots
- Clade: Rosids
- Order: Fabales
- Family: Fabaceae
- Subfamily: Faboideae
- Genus: Podolobium
- Species: P. aciculiferum

Binomial name
- Podolobium aciculiferum F.Muell.

Synonyms
- Oxylobium aciculiferum (F.Muell.) Benth.

= Podolobium aciculiferum =

Species of legume

Podolobium aciculiferum, commonly known as needle shaggy-pea, is a flowering plant in the family Fabaceae and endemic to eastern Australia. It has stiff, pointed leaves and yellow pea-like flowers with red markings.

== Description ==
Podolobium aciculiferum is a more or less prostrate or upright shrub usually to 1–3 m (3 ft 3 in – 9 ft 10 in) high with branches covered in short soft hairs. The leaves are mostly arranged opposite, occasionally alternate, narrow or broadly oval shaped, 1–2.5 mm (0.039–0.098 in) long, 3–9 mm (0.12–0.35 in) wide, upper surface shiny and veined, lower surface sparingly hairy or smooth. The yellow-orange pea flowers are borne singly or in axillary racemes and the corolla 5–9 mm (0.20–0.35 in) long. Flowering occurs in late spring and summer and the fruit is an oval to oblong shaped pod 6–10 mm (0.24–0.39 in) long, curved and hairy or smooth.

== Taxonomy and naming ==
Podolobium aciculiferum was first formally described in 1859 by Ferdinand von Mueller and the description was published in Fragmenta Phytographiae Australiae. The specific epithet (aciculiferum) means "needle-pointed".

== Distribution and habitat ==
Needle shaggy-pea grows in wet locations in sclerophyll forests and rainforest margins, usually in stony situations on escarpments and the coast north of Nerrigundah.
