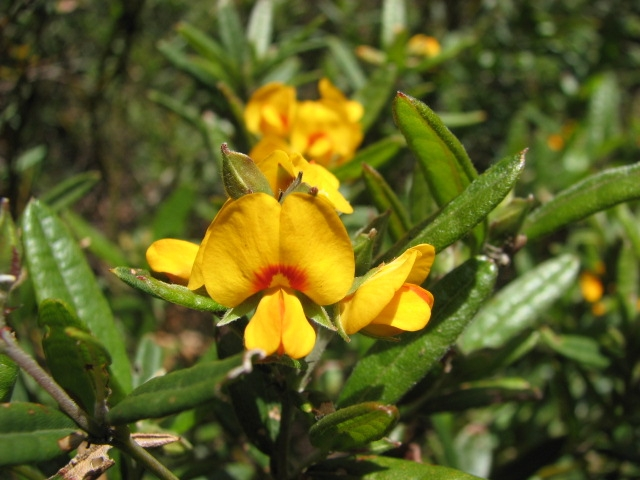
- Podolobium alpestre

Scientific classification
- Kingdom: Plantae
- Clade: Tracheophytes
- Clade: Angiosperms
- Clade: Eudicots
- Clade: Rosids
- Order: Fabales
- Family: Fabaceae
- Subfamily: Faboideae
- Clade: Mirbelioids
- Genus: Podolobium; R.Br.

Species
- See text

= Podolobium =

Shaggy peas

Genus of legumes

Podolobium, commonly known as shaggy peas, is a genus of six species of flowering plants in the family Fabaceae that are endemic to eastern Australia. The genus was formally described by botanist Robert Brown in Hortus Kewensis in 1811.

== Description ==
Podolobiums vary in size and habit from upright to prostrate forms and stems usually have soft, smooth hairs. The leaves are arranged alternately, opposite or whorled, margins smooth or lobed. The leaf upper surface is covered with a network of veins, occasionally warty, edges rolled under or flat, stipules stiff, rolled under or spreading. The inflorescence are at the end of branches or in racemes in leaf axils, clusters or corymbs, with 3-lobed bracts and usually falling off as the flower matures. The calyx has 5 more or less equal teeth, upper two wider and joined higher up. The flower petals are clawed, standard petal at the back of the flower is more or less rounded, notched at the apex, longer than the other petals. The stamens are free, the anthers even and the ovary stalked. The seed pods are oblong to egg-shaped.

== Taxonomy ==
The genus Podolobium was first formally described in 1811 by Robert Brown and the description was published in Hortus Kewensis.

== Distribution ==
All species of shaggy pea are endemic to Australia, found in Queensland, New South Wales and Victoria.

== Species list ==
The following species are accepted by the Australian Plant Census as at October 2020:

- Podolobium aciculiferum F.Muell. — needle shaggy-pea (N.S.W., Qld.)
- Podolobium aestivum Crisp & P.H.Weston (N.S.W.)
- Podolobium alpestre (F.Muell.) Crisp & P.H.Weston — alpine shaggy-pea (A.C.T., Vic., N.S.W.)
- Podolobium ilicifolium (Andrews) Crisp & P.H.Weston — prickly shaggy pea (Qld., Vic., N.S.W)
- Podolobium procumbens (F.Muell.) Crisp & P.H.Weston — trailing shaggy-pea (Vic., N.S.W)
- Podolobium scandens DC. — netted shaggy-pea (Qld., N.S.W)
