= Mount Buggery (Alpine Shire, Victoria) =

Mountain in Victoria, Australia

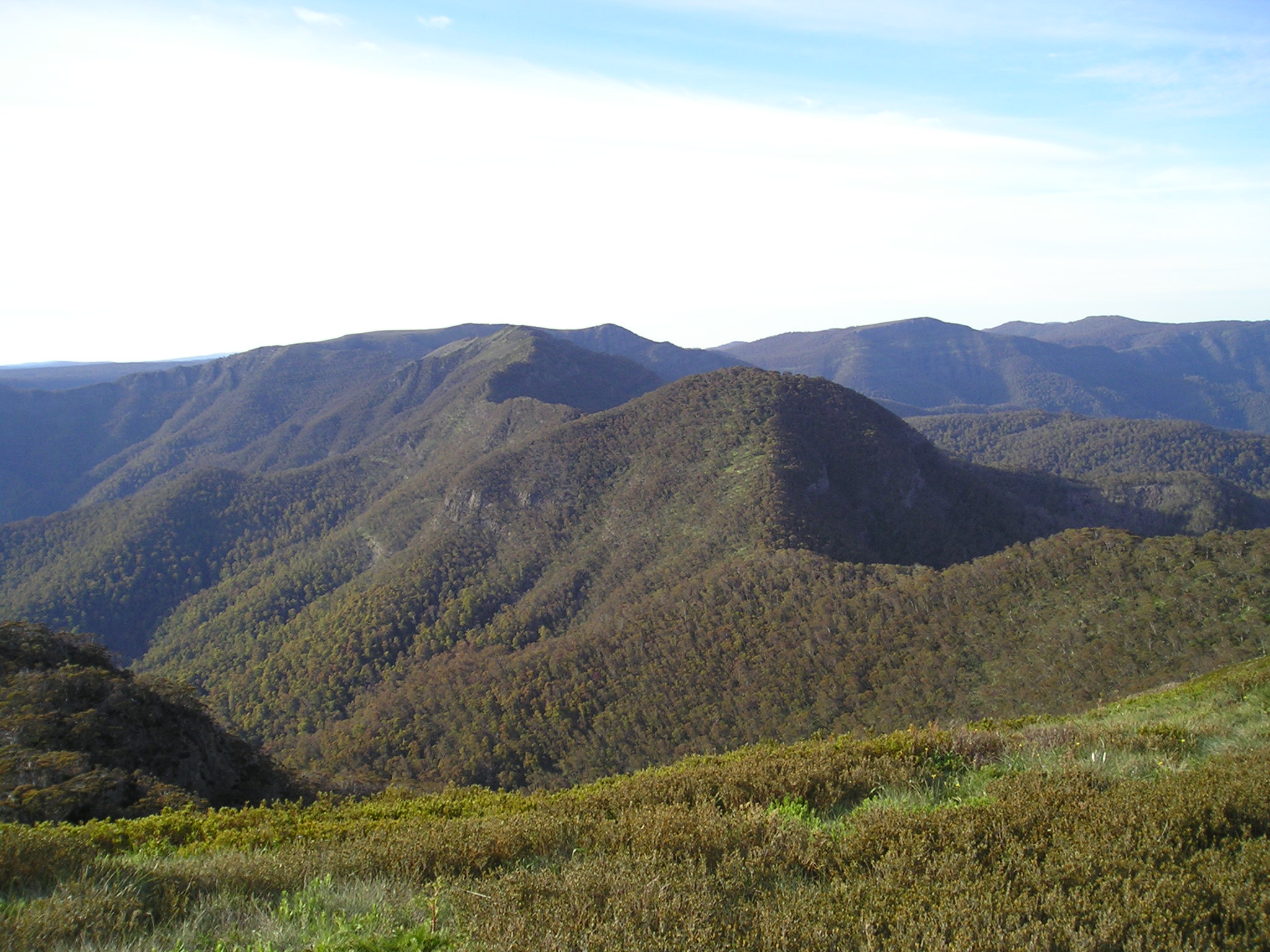
- Mount Buggery and Crosscut Saw from Mount Speculation

Highest point
- Elevation: 1,583–1,598 m (5,194–5,243 ft) AHD
- Coordinates: 37°08′35″S 146°38′27″E

Geography
- Location within Rural City of Wangaratta
- Location: Victoria, Australia
- Parent range: Great Dividing Range

Mount Buggery is a mountain located in the Alpine Shire within the Alpine National Park in the alpine region of Victoria, Australia. The mountain is located on the end of a ridgeline known as the Crosscut Saw between Mount Speculation and Mount Howitt, both located 4 kilometres (2.5 mi) to the south of Mount Buggery. The mountain is located on the Australian Alps Walking Track.

The summit of Mount Buggery rises in the range of 1,583–1,598 metres (5,194–5,243 ft) above sea level.

== Etymology ==
There is circumstantial evidence that the mountain was named by a member of the Melbourne Walking Club who, during 1934, hiked along the Buckland–Buffalo watershed to Mount Selwyn, and then on to the Barry Mountains to Mount Speculation, followed the Crosscut Saw to Mount Howitt, and finished at Merrijig via the Howqua River. Other members of the hiking party and within the Melbourne Walking Club started using the name, and it eventually appeared on maps; official acceptance followed.

== See also ==
- Alpine National Park
- List of mountains in Australia § Victoria
