= Embrace Life =

2010 British public information film

- The father and daughter.
- Directed by: Daniel Cox
- Written by: Daniel Cox
- Starring: Austin Spangler; Lara Corrochano; Clare Denning
- Distributed by: Sussex Safer Roads Partnership
- Release date: 20 January 2010
- Running time: 1 minute 29 seconds
- Country: United Kingdom
- Language: English
- Budget: £47,000

Embrace Life is a short British public information film made for the Sussex Safer Roads Partnership (SSRP) about the importance of wearing seat belts. Released on 20 January 2010 and initially only shown in the local Sussex area, the short film became an international phenomenon after it was distributed on the internet, through social networking sites and YouTube, gaining over a million views in its first two weeks. By 13 February 2010 it had reached 129 different countries, was the 5th top rated video that month on YouTube and was the most top rated YouTube film of all time in the education category. The film achieved the highest rating of No. 8 Top Rated (All Time) film on YouTube, and as of 27 March 2013 it has had over 16,599,000 views. The film has been praised for its beauty and its emotional impact. The film has so far not been shown on television as part of a road safety campaign; although that was for which it was primarily designed and its spread has been almost entirely through the internet.

== Development ==
External videos
- Embrace Life on YouTube

Despite being a legal requirement for all car drivers and passengers in the UK, some people fail to wear their seat belt. The Sussex Safer Roads Partnership is a local government body in the East Sussex and West Sussex areas of England, and was looking to produce an internet-based road safety campaign film with a positive message (rather than one using more graphic shock tactics) to create sustainable behaviour change. Double BAFTA Award–winning writer and director Daniel Cox learned of the proposed campaign, and approached the Partnership with an idea for just such a film:

Key to the film's creation was to focus on a message that didn't take a conventional route to shock and scare the audience; rather it was my intention to bring the audience in on the conversation of road safety, specifically seat belts, and the best way to do this was to make a film that could engage the viewer purely visually and could be seen and understood by all, whoever they are and wherever they lived.

— Daniel Cox

The name of the film, Embrace Life, reflects its focus on life rather than the death and injury often associated with car crashes. Producer Sarah Alexander joined the project and immediately was faced with the challenge of the logistics of bringing Cox's vision to fruition. He specifically wanted slow-motion photography, requiring state of the art camera technology and 93,000 watts of lighting required by the high-speed filming.

I wanted to create a visual metaphor addressing how a single decision in a person's day can greatly influence both their own and their loved ones' lives. Choosing to film the story inside the family living room represents the feelings many people equate with their own car, in that it represents a level of safety and protection from the 'outer' world. So to create the emotion of this dramatic moment, I wanted to tell the story using slow motion to allow the audience the time to be drawn into the film's world and to let them connect with and project their own feelings onto the scenario playing out before them. I wanted to give the audience the time to breathe, to absorb our message and using slow motion was the right technique to allow this to happen.

— Daniel Cox

It was central to the development of the project that we root the concept of wearing a seat belt firmly in the family domain, and create the advert so that it could be viewed by anyone of any age. Children are so important as opinion formers within their family that we felt it imperative to have a child take a pivotal role in relaying our message. One key aspect to the storytelling is that we developed Embrace Life to be non-language specific, so that the message wouldn’t become lost when viewed by visitors to, or residents of, the UK where English might not be their first language.

— Daniel Cox

The inspiration for Embrace Life came from wanting to offer a positive message towards road safety really. A lot of the campaigns focus on the more graphic and horrific outcomes of accidents, whereas I really wanted to bring people into the conversation. The house represents a safety area, an area where you're normally surrounded by your loved ones, and the car can be an extension of that, but it's not only yourself that's impacted if something unfortunately goes wrong, but also family and friends too.

— Daniel Cox

== Production ==
The film had a small budget of £47,000 (US$72,000) and was shot over two days in the summer of 2009 at Halliford Studios in London. The film was shot on a Phantom HD digital camera, with speeds of up to 1000 frames per second, and no CGI was used in the making of the film. It has a running time of 1 minute 29 seconds.

The music was specially composed for the film by Dutch composer Siddhartha (Sid) Barnhoorn, and is available as a download from his online music store.

=== Main credits ===
- Writer/Director: Daniel Cox
- Producer: Sarah Alexander
- Executive Producer: Neil Hopkins (Sussex Safer Roads Partnership)
- Director of Photography: Luke Scott
- Music Composer: Siddhartha Barnhoorn
- Production Designer: Aoife Wilson
- Art Director: James Custance
- Cast
  - Father: Austin Spangler
  - Mother: Lara Corrochano
  - Daughter: Clare Denning

A full list of credits can be found at the Sussex Safer Roads Partnership website.

== Film ==
A still from Embrace Life, showing the mother and daughter restraining the father

A father, mother and daughter are playing in their living room, with the father play-acting at driving a car: he turns an imaginary ignition key, operates an imaginary pedal and steers an imaginary wheel. His family watch from the sofa. The father turns to look at them, and as he turns back, his concentration momentarily taken from the "road", he sees some sort of peril approaching. He grimaces and turns the wheel to the left to avoid the oncoming threat. Realising the danger he is in, the daughter rushes to him and embraces him around the waist; his wife follows, putting her arms around his upper body, making the shape of a seat belt. The impact occurs, and the man is violently thrown in his seat; his legs jolt out and kick over a table with a bowl holding small metallic decorations. The bowl is thrown upwards and the metal decorations shower down. The daughter and mother successfully restrain the father, and he recovers, bringing his arms up to embrace his family who have saved him. The legend "Embrace Life Always wear your seat belt" appears on the left of the screen, and as the film fades to black the triangular grey, orange and blue Embrace Life logo is shown above that of the Sussex Safer Roads Partnership.

=== Imagery ===
The daughter's and mother's arms represent the two parts of a seat belt. The film was made for a British audience; cars are driven on the left hand side of the road in the UK and so the positioning of the mother's arms reflects the position of the upper seat belt strap for a driver in the UK. Similarly, the father turns the wheel to the left (the shoulder part of the road in the UK) to avoid the oncoming danger. If the film was shown in mirror image, it would correct these apparent inconsistencies for audiences in those parts of the world where cars are driven on the right hand side.

The daughter is wearing fairy wings. Some commentators have seen these as angel wings, symbolising a guardian angel. The small metallic decorations graphically represent the shattered windscreen glass and metal fragments generated during a car accident.

== Campaign ==
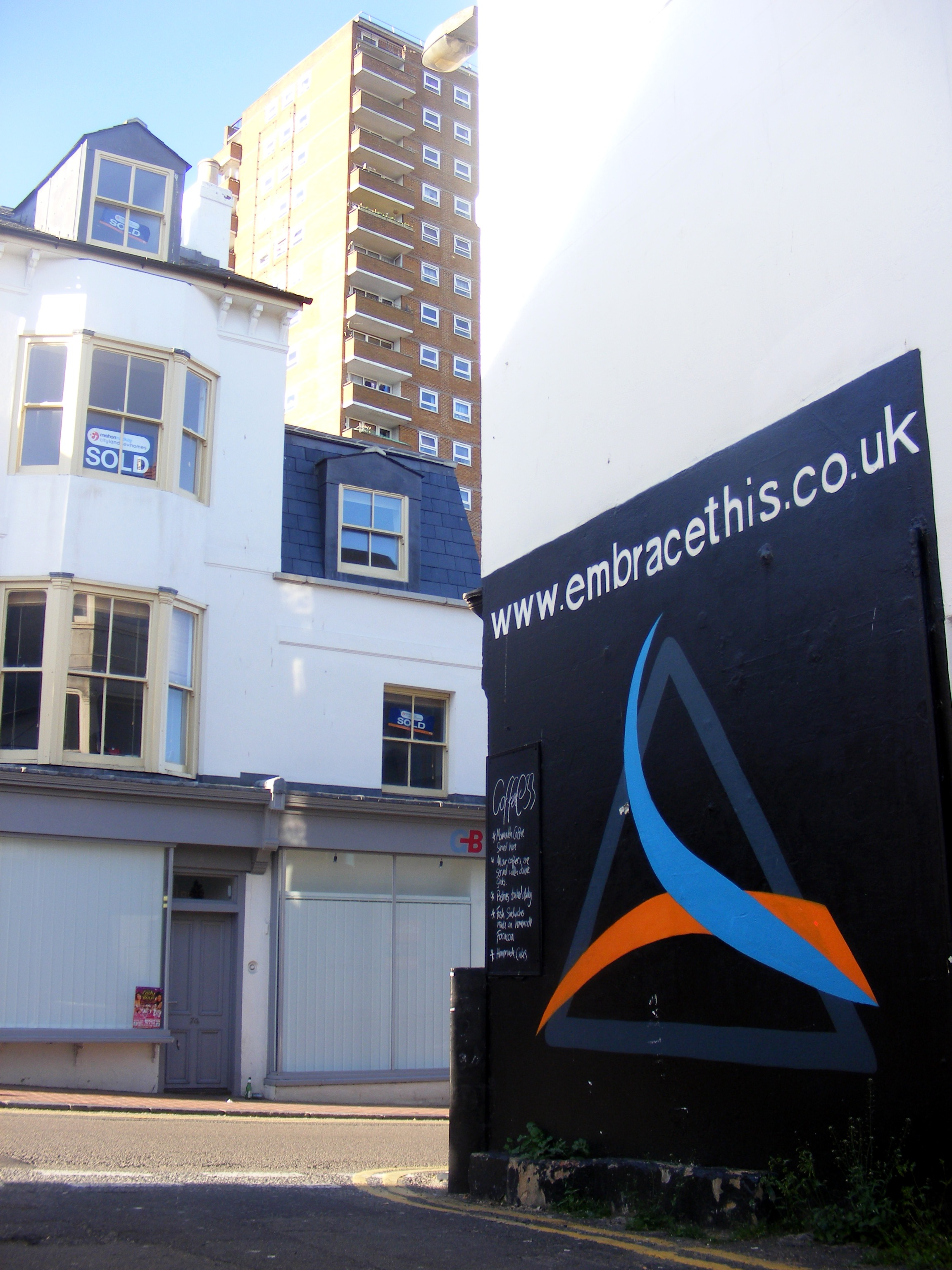
One of the Embrace Life logos in the council-sanctioned graffiti campaign in Brighton, with the Embrace This website address

The film was first shown to the Sussex Safer Roads Partnership members, including emergency services representatives, at The Capitol, Horsham, West Sussex on 20 January 2010. Alexander said of this occasion:

"The scariest part of making anything is the first time you show other people. Touching people’s emotions is not a science at all, it is an incredibly difficult thing to do and even after working on it for months you are still not sure how people will react. We always aimed to make something of TV/cinema quality so that is where we launched it. The first time I saw it on a cinema screen in front of an audience of hardened Police officers and realised they were touched, I was sure we had succeeded." (Sarah Alexander)

The marketing and promotion strategy for the film was driven by the Sussex Safer Roads Partnership Communications Team, led by Communications Manager, Neil Hopkins. The campaign was split into global outreach (focused on a blend of advertising/creative industry influencers and global road safety bodies) and local awareness raising. Within Sussex, the team delivered a data-driven out-of-home advertising, poster and flyering campaign, directing people to the Embrace Life website, which at this time only had a countdown clock and the Embrace Life logo (which represents a stylised seat belt). A direct mail campaign followed, aimed at key Sussex-based influencers. The quality of the campaign - which used thermochromic postcards (encouraging repeated interaction with the campaign materials) generated interest on Twitter and other social networking sites. At the same time, a council-sanctioned graffiti campaign was undertaken around Brighton and Hove, with Embrace Life logos (some up to 20 feet high) and the Embrace This website address painted by graffiti artist Aroe and his team. (The Embrace Life website address had already been taken, and so was not available. Embrace This was chosen as the alternative.) At the same time a public space art gallery was set up in a disused shop in Horsham. The existing web front page – at that time just the countdown clock and the logo – was shown on a large plasma screen along with props from the film and stills. These were all designed to give nothing away, to heighten curiosity about the campaign. Children were encouraged to interact by drawing a picture of what made them feel safe, and then to add it to the wall. By the end of the installation, the walls were covered with children's drawings, and visitors and participants were given a flier with the campaign's web address.

The film was launched on the website on 20 January 2010. The film was put on YouTube by the Sussex Safer Roads Partnership on 29 January 2010.

== Reception ==
A still from Embrace Life, showing the legend "Embrace Life: Always wear your seat belt"

The lack of dialogue means Embrace Life is accessible to all viewers, no matter what nationality. Once it was put on to the internet it rapidly spread around the globe, gaining over a million views in its first two weeks. By 10 February 2010 international interest in licensing the film for broadcasting on national or province/state TV channels had resulted in enquiries from some Persian Gulf countries, from Brazil, France, Ontario in Canada and from four states in the USA. By 13 February 2010 it had reached 129 different countries, was the 5th top rated video that month on YouTube and was the most top rated YouTube film of all time in the education category.

The film was discussed by the British Parliamentary Advisory Council for Transport Safety.

Comedian Ze Frank blogged about the film, and American Idol presenter Ryan Seacrest also embedded the YouTube film in his website, describing it as "beautiful", "visually arresting" and "poignant".

An article in the New York Daily News drew a comparison between the poorly received (and expensive) advertisements during the Super Bowl XLIV on 7 February 2010 and "the breath of fresh air" of Embrace Life. The film was shown at the TED conference on 13 February in California immediately before James Cameron's speech.

Josh Levs on CNN said that he was "stunned" by the film, "which has been praised by people around the world for its beauty." After watching it during his report, a visibly emotional Levs said "It gets me every time." The film was featured on The Wanda Sykes Show on Fox on 15 May 2010.

On 2 May 2010 it was reported that the Sussex Safer Roads Partnership had received enquiries from bodies such as the United Nations, from European schools and American traffic police, and from major companies about the licensing the film for broadcast. The film's Executive Producer, Neil Hopkins of SSRP commented: "From a really small start it's become a global monster. It's smashed all our expectations. We're handling licensing requests from state troopers in the US, big firms like Shell, talk shows, the French government, schools and road safety organisations." The money raised from licensing will be used by the SSRP for further road safety schemes in Sussex.

So far, the film has not been shown on British national television as part of a road safety campaign, although it was featured on Live from Studio Five on Five on 19 April 2010 and there is a Facebook campaign to get it shown on British television as part of a road safety campaign.

Neil Hopkins said of the film's success:

"Originally, we wanted something to run on local cinema screens, on my workplace’s website, and on DVDs at educational interventions within our county. We never dreamed that the campaign would touch so many people."

=== Awards and honours ===
On 12 June 2010 Embrace Life was awarded the 2010 Gold World Medal for Best Digital and Interactive Campaign at the New York Festivals International Advertising Awards ceremony in Shanghai. On 26 June 2010 it won a Bronze award in the Cannes Lions International Advertising Festival, in the Public Health & Safety category. Embrace Life was also shortlisted for the UK's Chartered Institute of Highways and Transport / Atkins 'Road Safety – Reducing All Casualties' Award, in the awards ceremony of 16 June 2010, but did not win. In November 2010 Embrace Life won the inaugural YouTube Advert of the Year Award, winning with three times more votes than its nearest competitor.

As of 8 December 2015, Embrace Life has had 19,035,272 views on the Sussex Safer Roads channel on YouTube. Highest honours for the video on YouTube include No. 8 Top Rated (All Time), No. 1 Top Rated (All Time) Education and No. 1 Top Favourited (All Time) Education. It reached its highest Top Rated (All Time) rating in late April-early May 2010.
