= Bugger =

Slang term or mild expletive

Bugger or buggar can at times be considered as a mild swear word. In the United Kingdom the term has been used commonly to imply dissatisfaction, refer to someone or something whose behaviour is in some way inconvenient or perhaps as an expression of surprise. In the United States, particularly in the Midwest and South, it is an inoffensive slang term meaning "small animal".

The term is used in the vernacular of British English, Australian English, New Zealand English, South African English, Hawaiian Pidgin, Indian English, Pakistani English, Canadian English, Caribbean English, Malaysian English, Singaporean English and in Sri Lankan English.

== Etymology ==
It is derived from Anglo-Norman bougre, from Latin Bulgarus, in reference to Bulgaria, from which the Bogomils, a sect labeled by church authorities as heretics, were thought to have come in the 11th century, after other heretics to whom abominable practices were imputed in an abusively disparaging manner. (The word Bogomil itself is not etymologically related.)

== History ==
The term is thought to have emerged around the early 13th century, after Pope Innocent III and the northern French kingdom engaged in the Albigensian Crusade in southern France. This led to the slaughter of about 20,000 men, women and children, Cathar and Catholic alike and brought the region firmly under the control of the King of France. The crusade was directed against heretical Christians and the nobility of Toulouse and vassals of the Crown of Aragon. The populace of Provence and Northern Italy sympathized with the victims of the crusade because of their moral purity. It was then that the Catholic clergy launched a vilifying campaign against them, associating them with unorthodox sexual practices and sodomy.

== Usage ==
=== Noun ===
In some English speaking communities the word has been in use traditionally without any profane connotations. For instance, within the Anglo-Indian community in India the word bugger has been in use, in an affectionate manner, to address or refer to a close friend or fellow schoolmate. In the United States it can be a rough synonym to whippersnapper as in calling a young boy a "little bugger".

In 1978, Mr Justice Sir Melford Stevenson, QC was reprimanded for calling the British Sexual Offences Act 1967 a "buggers' charter".

=== Verb ===
As a verb, the word is used in Commonwealth English to denote sodomy. In Great Britain, the phrase "Bugger me sideways" (or a variation of this) can be used as an expression of surprise. It can also be used as a synonym for "broken", as in "This PC's buggered" (similar to the verb bricked); "Oh no! I've buggered it up"; or "It's gone to buggery". In Anglophone Southern Africa, Australia, Canada and Britain, "buggered" is colloquially used to describe something, usually a machine or vehicle, as broken.

The phrase "bugger off" (bug off in American English) means to go, or run, away; when used as a command it means "go away" ("get lost" or "leave me alone") and can also be used in much the same type of relatively offensive manner.

"I'm buggered", "I'll be buggered" and "bugger me" are used colloquially in Great Britain (and often in New Zealand and Australia as well) to denote or feign surprise at an unexpected (or possibly unwanted) occurrence. "I'm buggered" can also be used to indicate a state of fatigue. In this latter form it found fame in New Zealand in 1956 through rugby player Peter Jones, who—in a live post-match radio interview—declared himself "absolutely buggered", a turn of phrase considered shocking at the time.

It is famously alleged that the last words of King George V were "Bugger Bognor", in response to a suggestion that he might recover from his illness and visit Bognor Regis. Variations on the phrase "bugger it" are commonly used to imply frustration, admission of defeat or the sense that something is not worth doing, as in "bugger this for a lark" or "bugger this for a game of soldiers".

=== Interjection ===
As an interjection, "bugger" is sometimes used as a single-word expletive. "Buggeration" is a derivation occasionally found in British English.

As with many expletives, its continued use has reduced its shock value and offensiveness. Thus the Toyota car company in Australia and New Zealand ran a popular series of advertisements where "Bugger!" was the only spoken word (with exception of an utterance of "bugger me!") (frequently repeated); they then ran a censored version of the ad in which "Bugger!" was bleeped out, as a joke against those who spoke out against the ad claiming it was offensive. The term is generally not used in the United States, but it is recognised, although inoffensive there. It is also used in Canada more frequently than in the United States but with less stigma than in other parts of the world. In the pre-watershed television version of Four Weddings and a Funeral the opening sequence is modified from repeated exclamations of "Fuck!" by Hugh Grant and Charlotte Coleman when they are late for the first wedding to repeated exclamations of "Bugger!".

== Derived terms ==
=== Bagarapim ===
"Bagarap" (from "buggered up") is a common word in Pacific pidgins such as Tok Pisin of Papua New Guinea, Brokan (Torres Strait Creole) of Australia and Papua and others, meaning "broken", "hurt", "ruined", "destroyed", "tired", and so on, as in Tok Pisin "kanu i bagarap", Brokan "kenu i bagarap", "the canoe is broken" or Tok Pisin/Brokan "kaikai i bagarap", "the food is spoiled". Tok Pisin "mi bagarap pinis" ("me bugger-up finish") means, "I am very tired", or "I am very ill", while the Brokan equivalent, "ai pinis bagarap", is more "I'm done in", "I'm finished/I've had it". The term was put to use in the album Bagarap Empires by Fred Smith, which was made to capture the peace process in Bougainville, an island province of Papua New Guinea; in a number of the songs he uses Melanesian pidgin, the language used in Bougainville and elsewhere.

=== Little buggers ===
"Little buggers" means children, a term so familiar in the United Kingdom that there is a series of professional teaching manuals with titles that start "Getting the buggers to ..."

=== Bugger about ===
"To bugger about" means to mess around, to do something ineffectively.

=== Bugger all ===
"Bugger all" means "nothing", as in You may not like paying taxes, but there's bugger all you can do about it and The police are doing bugger all about all this aggro that's going on. See also fuck all, sweet FA, and Llareggub ("bugger all" spelled backwards, a fictional Welsh town in Dylan Thomas' radio play Under Milk Wood).

=== Bugger me ===
The phrase "bugger me" is a slang term used when expressing surprise that a situation has yielded an unexpected or undesirable result.

Common usage includes "bugger me dead" and "bugger me blind".

=== Bugger's muddle ===
Colloquial military term for a disorderly group—either assembled without formation or in a formation that does not meet the standards of the commentator: "just form a bugger's muddle", "there's a bugger's muddle of civvies hanging around the gate", "Get that bugger's muddle of yours fallen in properly".

=== Bugger off ===
The phrase "bugger off" is a slang or dismissive term meaning "go away" or "leave".

=== Buggery ===
The word buggery today also serves as a general expletive (mild, moderate or severe depending on the context and company), and can be used to replace the word bugger as a simple expletive or as a simile in phrases which do not actually refer literally in any sense to buggery itself, but just use the word for its informal strength of impact, e.g., Run like buggery, which is equivalent to Run like hell but would be regarded by most listeners as more obscene.

=== Embuggerance ===
Eric Partridge defined embuggerance factor as "a natural or artificial hazard that complicates any proposed course of action". It was reportedly British military slang in the 1950s. Terry Pratchett used the word in this sense when he referred to his Alzheimer's disease, which had prevented him from attending conventions, as "the Embuggerance".

=== Play silly buggers ===
To act in a stupid or reckless manner. (Britain, Canada, Australia, New Zealand)

== See also ==
- Buggery
- Buggery Act 1533
- Bogomils
