= Mount Cobbler =

Mountain in Victoria, Australia

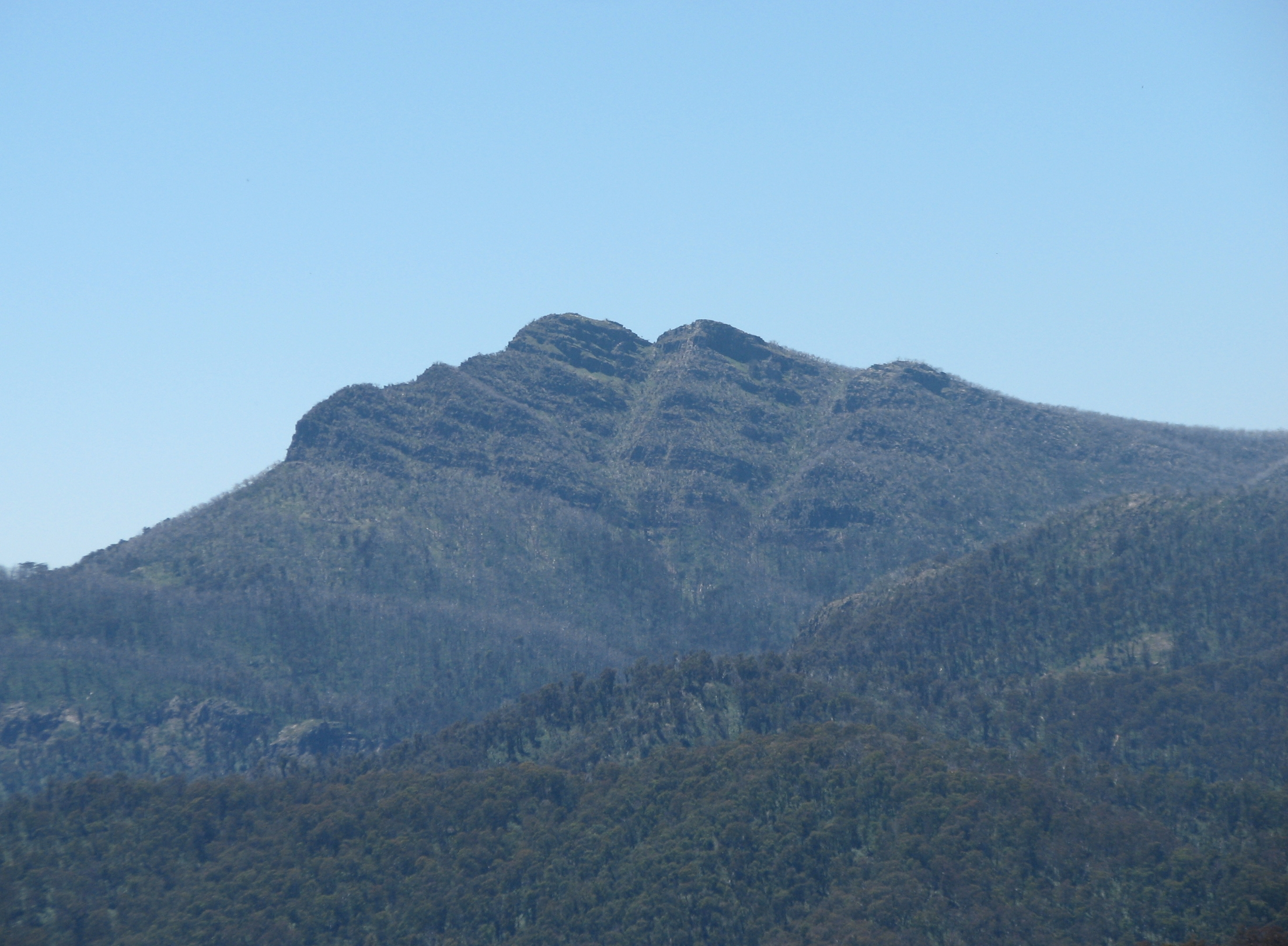
- Mount Cobbler viewed from Mount Stirling

Highest point
- Elevation: 1,628 metres (5,341 ft) AHD
- Coordinates: 37°2′38″S 146°35′27″E

Geography
- Location within Rural City of Wangaratta
- Location: Victoria, Australia
- Parent range: Great Dividing Range

Mount Cobbler is a mountain located in the Alpine National Park to the east of Mansfield in north-eastern Victoria, Australia. Its summit rises to 1,628 metres (5,341 ft) above sea level. The peak and surrounding Cobbler land system are composed of sedimentary rocks (conglomerate, red sandstone, siltstone and shale), dating to the Lower Carboniferous period, some 359 to 318 million years ago.

Nearby Lake Cobbler, which has a camping area, is accessible by a four-wheel drive track. From there is a walking track to the summit, and another to Dandongadale Falls, which drops 255 metres (837 ft) from the plateau and is the highest waterfall in Victoria. The 5-kilometre (3-mile) walk to the summit is moderate to steep. Surrounding peaks include Mount Typo to the north-east, Mount Koonika and Mount Speculation to the south-east, and Mount Stirling to the south-west.

Tree species occurring on the surrounding plateau include mountain gum (Eucalyptus dalrympleana), snow gum (E. pauciflora) and broad-leaved peppermint (E. dives). Heathland, shrubland and patches of herbfield are found on the rocky escarpments, with species including alpine shaggy-pea (Podolobium alpestre) and mountain beardheath (Acrothamnus hookeri).

Annual rainfall ranges between 1,250–1,500 millimetres (49–59 in), with snowfalls regularly experienced in winter.

== See also ==
- Alpine National Park
- List of mountains in Australia § Victoria
