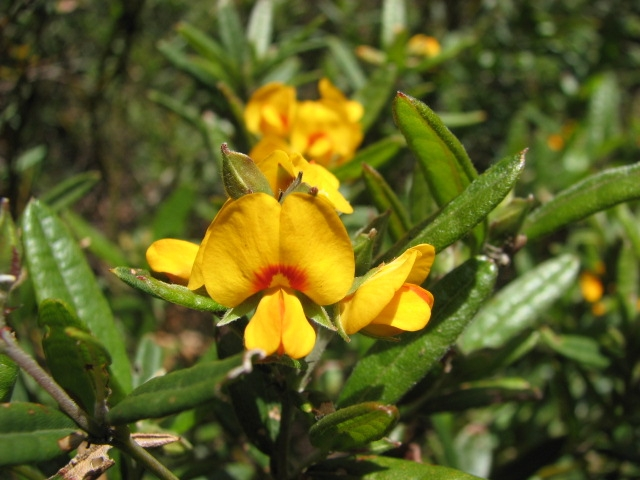
- Podolobium alpestre, Baw Baw National Park, Victoria

Scientific classification
- Kingdom: Plantae
- Clade: Tracheophytes
- Clade: Angiosperms
- Clade: Eudicots
- Clade: Rosids
- Order: Fabales
- Family: Fabaceae
- Subfamily: Faboideae
- Genus: Podolobium
- Species: P. alpestre

Binomial name
- Podolobium alpestre (F.Muell.) Crisp & P.H.Weston

Synonyms
- Callistachys alpestris (F.Muell.) Kuntze; Oxylobium alpestre F.Muell.

= Podolobium alpestre =

Species of legume

Podolobium alpestre, commonly known as alpine shaggy-pea, is a flowering plant in the family Fabaceae and is endemic to south-eastern Australia. It has oblong to egg-shaped leaves and yellow to orange pea-like flowers with red markings.

== Description ==
Podolobium alpestre is an ascending or low spreading shrub to 1.3 mm (0.051 in) high with young stems covered in soft, short hairs. The leaves are arranged in whorls of three or opposite, egg-shaped to broad-oblong, 1–5 cm (0.39–1.97 in) long and 3–14 mm (0.12–0.55 in) wide. The pea-shaped flowers are borne in terminal or axillary racemes are yellow-orange, pea-shaped, occasionally with red markings on a silky pedicel 1–3 mm (0.039–0.118 in) long. The bracts are lance shaped or narrow, tapering to a point and 1–2 mm (0.039–0.079 in) long. Flowering occurs from November to February and the fruit is an oval shaped pod 8–15 mm (0.31–0.59 in) long with numerous warty creases, tapering to a point and covered with long, soft straight hairs.

== Taxonomy and naming ==
Podolobium alpestre was first formally described 1855 by Ferdinand von Mueller and the description was published in Definitions of rare or hitherto undescribed Australian Plants, chiefly collected within the boundaries of the colony of Victoria. Mueller gave it the name Oxylobium alpestre. The species was transferred to the genus Podolobium in 1995.

== Distribution and habitat ==
Alpine shaggy-pea occurs in alpine heaths and high-altitude woodland in Victoria, New South Wales and the Australian Capital Territory.
