= Bugger (advertising campaign) =

Automotive advertisement campaign in Australia and New Zealand

- Red Toyota Hilux Xtracab, similar one in the New Zealand advertisement
- Agency: Saatchi & Saatchi
- Client: Toyota
- Running time: 45 seconds (New Zealand)
- Release date: March 1999
- Slogan: Bugger
- Directed by: Tony Williams
- Starring: Hercules (dog)
- Country: Australia and New Zealand

In 1999, Toyota released an advertising campaign with two television advertisements in Australia and New Zealand for the Toyota Hilux. It caused controversy in New Zealand for its use of the swear word bugger, receiving 120 complaints and getting it temporarily pulled from airing.

The Advertising Standards Authority did not uphold the complaints due to it airing after 8:30 p.m. and because the word was a "typically Kiwi expression of surprise disbelief and frustration".

== Advertisements ==
=== Australia ===
The advert starts with a young apprentice tradie being sent by an older worker to get some supplies in a red Hilux cab chassis with a dog in the tray. As the apprentice walks into the gate of the store and realises he forgot to apply the handbrake, as the Hilux rolls down the road he jumps in the tray. It goes through a brick wall, where a bricklayer reacts by saying bugger, then a garden knocking down small trees, with an old lady gardening exclaims bugger, then a bus stop and causes a baby to drop ice cream on itself and says bugger. The Hilux comes racing through the middle the original worksite, causing the workers to flee out of its way, it speeds past a dunny opening its door and causing it to fall apart and crashes head on into a tree flinging the apprentice and dog in the air, the older worker comes out from the dunny and reacts to the sight of the Hilux with the supplies and exclaims bugger, then the dog falls in the dunny and says bugger.

=== New Zealand ===
The advert starts with a farmer trying to push a leaning fencepost upright with a red Hilux Xtracab but the car goes too far forward and causes a long series of fenceposts to fall the other way, and reacts by saying bugger. The second clip has him try to tow a tractor with the Hilux and pulls off the front axle of the tractor, and says "bugger me" in surprise. The third clip he tries to pull a tree stump out of the ground with the Hilux but uses too much force and flings it into a dunny, and says bugger. The fourth clip the farmer attatches a rope to a cow stuck in mud as someone else tries to tow it out, off-screen the cow lets out a painful scream, the farmer says bugger while wincing. The fifth clip the farmer leaves home in the Hilux as calls for the dog, it tries jumping in the tray as the car moving and instead falls in mud, the car also flings mud onto the sheets on the clothes line, both the farmer's wife and the dog react by saying bugger. The final clip has the Hilux going over the hill and making a sound off-screen that the farmer reacts to by saying bugger.

The reason for the accidents in the advertisement was because the Hilux was "too powerful".

== Impact ==
=== Ban ===
The advertisement caused controversy for its use of the word bugger, which has a historic use as a term for sodomy, but has gone through semantic bleaching. The Advertising Standards Authority (ASA) later stated that the term was a "typically Kiwi expression of surprise disbelief and frustration".

The advertisement received 120 complaint for swearing and was temporarily pulled off the air in New Zealand, in Australia it received a single complaint for the swearing. It also received 145 signatures on a petition to ban it, and five letters supporting it. It is the New Zealand television advertisement with the most complaints as of 2024.

The ASA complaints board stated that the term bugger was part of rural humour and unlikely to cause serious offence due to the advertisement airing after 8:30 p.m, the complaints were not upheld and the ad started airing again. In a consumer research poll by the ASA 81 percent of respondents liked the ad and 82 percent felt it was not offensive.

=== Legacy ===
It received over 10 awards, including a Gold Lion from the 1999 Cannes International Advertising Festival. In a 2016 poll by The New Zealand Herald it was voted the second best television advertisement, with 47 percent of the votes for Bugger and 53 percent for Ghost Chips.

Hercules, the dog in the advertisement later won the Australian Dog of the Year. He died on 25 May 2004.

The word bugger was cemented in the New Zealand vernacular due to the advertisement. In 2024 Toyota released an advertisement for the Hilux referencing the "Bugger" advertisement.
