= Mount Buggery (Wangaratta, Victoria) =

Mountain in Victoria, Australia

- Location within Alpine Shire

Highest point
- Elevation: 1,153 metres (3,783 ft) AHD
- Coordinates: 36°54′10″S 146°44′35″E

Geography
- Location: Victoria, Australia
- Parent range: Great Dividing Range

Mount Buggery is a mountain located in the Wangaratta Rural City local government area, near Abbeyard above the Buffalo River in the alpine region of Victoria, Australia.

Its summit rises to 1,153 metres (3,783 ft) above sea level.

== See also ==
- Alpine National Park
- List of mountains in Australia § Victoria
