= Buffalo River (Victoria) =

Buffalo East Buffalo, West Buffalo
- Location of the Buffalo River mouth in Victoria

Location
- Country: Australia
- State: Victoria
- Region: Victorian Alps (IBRA), Victorian Alps
- Local government area: Alpine Shire

Physical characteristics
- Source: Buffalo Range, Victorian Alps
- Source confluence: East and West branches of the Buffalo River
  - location: Mount Buffalo National Park
  - coordinates: 36°58′56″S 146°46′13″E
  - elevation: 434 m (1,424 ft)
- Mouth: confluence with the Ovens River
  - location: west of Myrtleford
  - coordinates: 36°33′7″S 146°41′21″E
  - elevation: 206 m (676 ft)
- Length: 65 km (40 mi)

Basin features
- River system: North-East Murray catchment, Murray-Darling basin
- Tributaries
  - left: Catherine River (Victoria), Brandy Creek, Four Mile Creek (Victoria), Dandongadale River, Cropper Creek, Long Corner Creek
  - right: Camp Creek (Victoria), Yarrarabula Creek, Sandy Creek (Buffalo River, Victoria)
- National park: Mount Buffalo National Park

The Buffalo River is a perennial river of the North-East Murray catchment of the Murray-Darling basin, located in the Alpine region of eastern Victoria, Australia. It flows from the eastern slopes of the Buffalo Range in the Australian Alps, joining with the Ovens River west of Myrtleford.

== Location and features ==
Formed by the east and west branches of the river, the headwaters of the Buffalo River rise in the Barry Mountains below Mount Selwyn and The Razor at an elevation exceeding 1,300 metres (4,300 ft) above sea level. The east and west branches of the river reach their confluence within the Mount Buffalo National Park, where the watercourse becomes the Buffalo River. The river flows generally north, much of its course through the remote national park, joined by nine tributaries including the Catherine River and the Dandongadale River, before reaching its confluence with the Ovens River west of the town of Myrtleford and adjacent to the Great Alpine Road. The river descends 228 metres (748 ft) over its 65-kilometre (40 mi) course.

The river is impounded by the Buffalo Dam that creates the 24,000-megalitre (5.3×10^{9} imp gal; 6.3×10^{9} US gal) reservoir called Lake Buffalo, which was completed in 1965 and supplies potable water to Myrtleford and irrigation of the Goulburn Valley.

== See also ==
- List of rivers of Australia § Victoria
