= Hoys Roadlines =

Australian bus operator

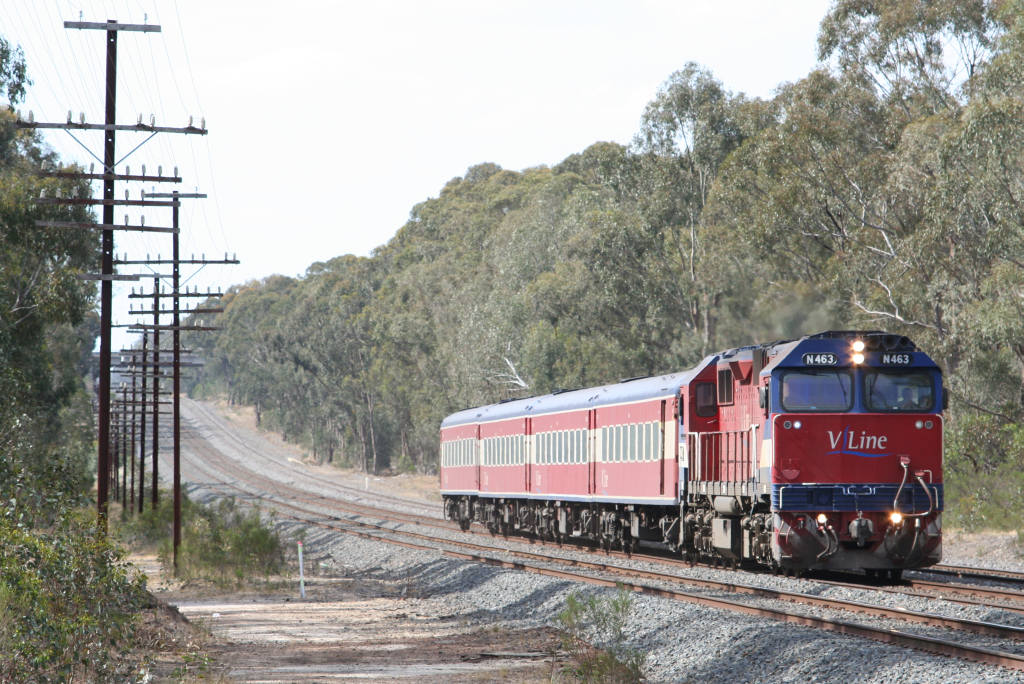
- N class locomotive and N set as used by Hoys Roadlines on the North East line in October 2007
- Founded: 1930
- Ceased operation: 2005
- Headquarters: Wangaratta
- Service area: North East Victoria
- Service type: Bus & rail services
- Fleet: Rail: Hired N Locomotives and N Set Carriages from V/Line Passenger
- Website: www.buslines.com.au/hoys

Hoys Roadlines was an Australian bus operator based in the Victorian city of Wangaratta. From 1993 until 2004 the company also had a contract to operate train services on the Shepparton line on behalf of the Victorian State Government.

== Bus services ==
The company commenced operations in 1930 from Wangaratta in the north-east of Victoria, to Shepparton, Bright and the Mount Buffalo Chalet. The company later expanded into school bus runs, charter coaches, and Department of Infrastructure contract coach services such as the daily Albury to Adelaide service. The company begun to downsize their operations after the loss of the rail franchise, the Adelaide to Albury route operations being purchased by Dysons in August 2004 and the remaining operations by V/Line in July 2005.

== Rail services ==
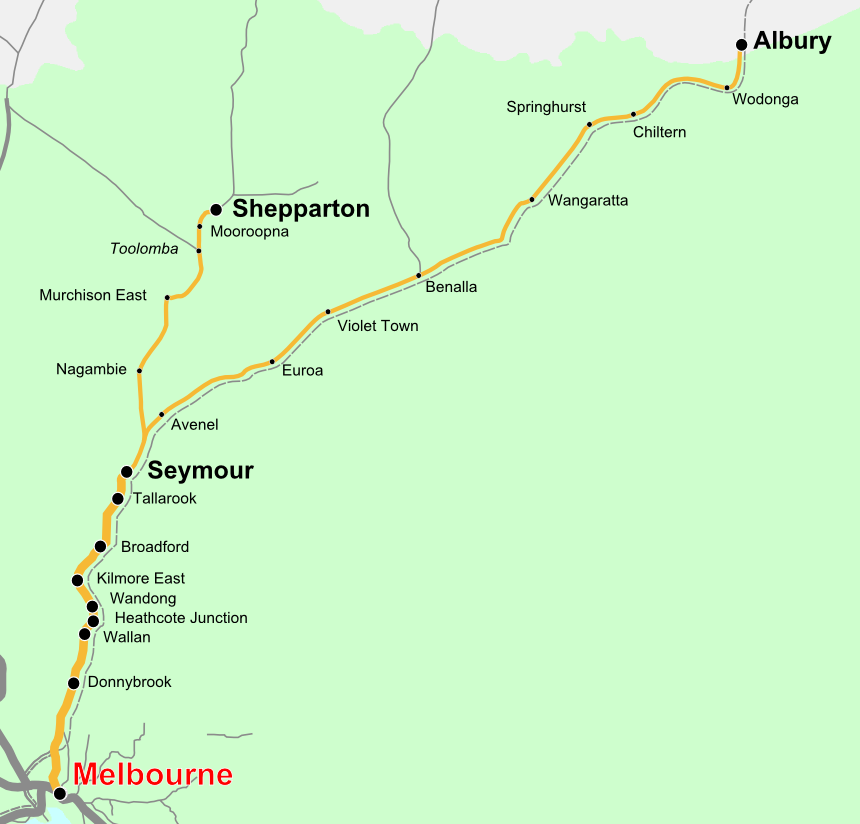
Map of the North East railway line

=== History ===
In August 1993 the Kennett State Government put the operation of nine country passenger rail services to tender. Companies were invited to use trains, buses, or a combination of the two. Hoys won a seven-year contract for the Melbourne to Cobram service from 1 July 1994.

Hoys opted to operate trains as far as Shepparton, with buses beyond. Station staff, conductors and buffet staff were employed by Hoys; but the trains themselves were operated and maintained under a lease arrangement with V/Line. This was in contrast to the other private company to win a contact, West Coast Railway for the Melbourne to Warrnambool service, who decided to purchase, maintain and operate its own trains.

=== Contracts ===
Two contracts were entered into by Hoys. The first was with the Department of Transport to provide a public service of acceptable standard and be compensated at an agreed rate per passenger carried per sector, these being Melbourne - Seymour, Seymour - Shepparton, and Shepparton - Seymour. A second agreed cost contract was made with V/Line for the provision of locomotives, crews, carriages, train maintenance and servicing, safeworking training and implementation, and food and drink catering services. Hoys could have extra passenger cars or luggage vans added to the train at an extra cost. Loading figures were given to V/Line every 28 days.

=== Operations ===
From 1 July 1994 the company was contracted with the Department of Transport to provide 26 services each week. These included four trains and two buses (two and one each way) Melbourne to Shepparton Monday to Saturday, with one train each way on Sundays. A bus connection were made to Cobram, with some buses extended to Tocumwal. A six-month trial was also made for bus services to Finley and Berrigan in New South Wales, and a service to Griffith was later introduced.

Hoys employed 11 staff, with half of them former V/Line employees. They included a station master at Shepparton, two station staff and five conductors, all trained by V/Line in safeworking. A company conductor was in charge of the train, with a second conductor in charge of the buffet. Conductors could only sell tickets for Hoys operated services, with passengers connecting to V/Line services needing to buy tickets at Spencer Street station, or from the ticket agent at Shepparton.

The company was responsible for the unstaffed Nagambie, Murchison East and Mooroopna stations, as well Shepparton station which was staffed. Trains were cleaned by Hoys at Shepparton during the daytime layover, with a thorough cleaning carried out when the train was stabled overnight. Any locomotives and carriages from the V/Line fleet could be assigned to the service, with no special Hoys branding applied.

The usual consist of the trains was a 3 carriage N set providing 206 first and economy class seats, carrying 80-100 passengers at Shepparton, and 160-200 further along the line to Melbourne. By 1995 a 5.5% increase in patronage had been recorded. An average of 188 passenger per service was recorded, with 5,500 sector fares sold per week. Local radio advertisement promoting the train were made, as some locals believed the train had been completely cancelled in 1993.

=== End of contract ===
The initial contract was due to expire in June 2001, but was extended for a further three years. During the contact period V/Line itself had been privatised, with services now operated under contract by National Express, who in December 2002 withdrew from their operations in Victoria with V/Line passing back to full State Government control.

In August 2002, the State Government commenced negotiating with Hoys for a contract extension to 2006, but this was not concluded and V/Line took back the service when the franchise expired on 30 June 2004.

== See also ==
- Shepparton railway line
- West Coast Railway (Victoria)
