= Murchison East railway station =

Railway station in Victoria, Australia

Murchison East
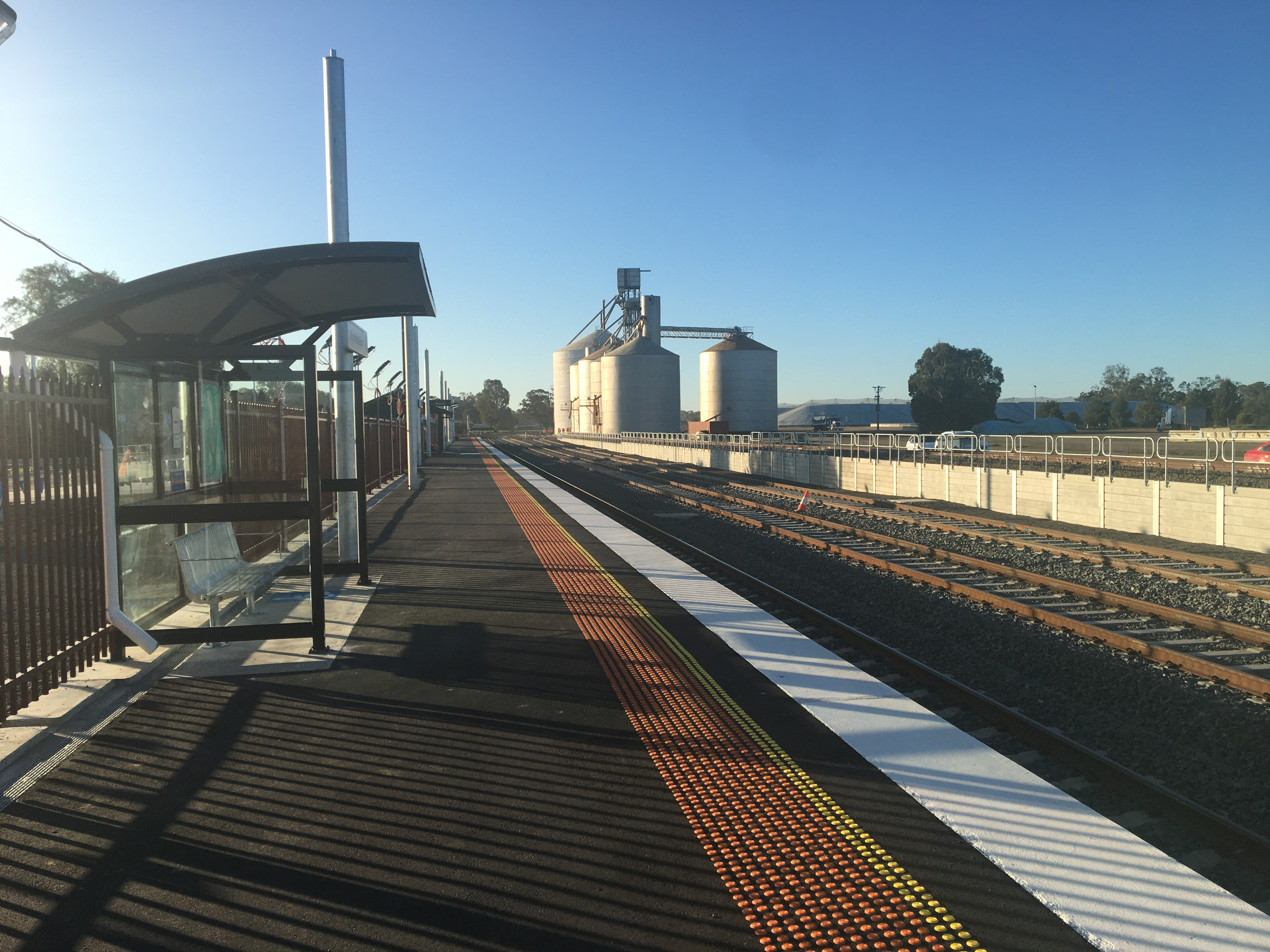
- Northbound view from the station platform, July 2022

General information
- Location: Cassidys Road, Murchison East, Victoria 3610; City of Greater Shepparton; Australia
- Coordinates: 36°36′47″S 145°14′26″E
- System: PTV regional rail station
- Owner: VicTrack
- Operator: V/Line
- Line: Shepparton (Tocumwal)
- Distance: 147.25 kilometres from Southern Cross
- Platforms: 1
- Tracks: 3

Construction
- Structure type: Ground
- Parking: Yes
- Accessible: Yes

Other information
- Status: Operational, unstaffed
- Station code: MST
- Fare zone: Myki zone 10
- Website: Public Transport Victoria

History
- Opened: 1 September 1890; 136 years ago
- Rebuilt: August 2022
- Former names: Murchison

Passengers
- 2013–2014: 14,228
- 2014–2015: 12,253 ▼13.88%
- 2015–2016: 12,533 ▲2.28%
- 2016–2017: 11,386 ▼9.15%
- 2017–2018: Not measured
- 2018–2019: 11,350 ▼0.31%
- 2019–2020: 9,900 ▼12.77%
- 2020–2021: 4,300 ▼56.56%

Services
Preceding station	V/Line	Following station
Nagambie towards Southern Cross	Shepparton line	Mooroopna towards Shepparton
Location
- Location within Victoria

Murchison East railway station is a regional railway station operated by V/Line on the Tocumwal and Shepparton lines, part of the Victoria rail network. It serves the town of Murchison East, in Victoria, Australia. Murchison East is a ground-level unstaffed station, featuring one side platform. The station opened on 1 September 1890, with the current station provided in August 2022.

The station originally opened as Murchison.

== History ==
Murchison East station opened on 1 September 1890, just over ten years after the railway line from Mangalore to Shepparton opened.

The station became a junction in the month that it opened, when the line to Rushworth opened, branching off at the southern (up) end of the station. That line was later extended to Colbinabbin and Girgarre. In 1987, the Rushworth line closed.

In 1974, flashing light signals replaced hand gates at the Goulburn Valley Highway level crossing, located nearby in the up direction of the station. In 2009, boom barriers were provided.

The station has the longest passing loop on the line, totalling 870 metres in length. However, in 2013, the loop was booked out of service due to poor track condition. A number of other sidings that serve a grain silo complex are located opposite the platform.

On 4 June 2014, the station building was destroyed by fire. The main timber station building had been fenced off, and a new passenger shelter constructed alongside.

As part of the Regional Rail Revival project to upgrade the Shepparton line, the platform was extended to accommodate VLocity trains. The crossing loop was also extended, enabling trains to pass each other. By August 2022, the project was completed, and included new lighting, seating, shelter and CCTV, as well an upgraded car park and upgraded paths leading to the station.

Closed station Wahring was located between Murchison East and Nagambie, while closed stations Arcadia and Toolamba were located between Murchison East and Mooroopna.

== Platforms and services ==
Murchison East has one platform. It is serviced by V/Line Shepparton line services. Occasionally, some services terminate here instead of terminating at Shepparton.

Murchison East platform arrangement
Platform	Line	Destination
1	Shepparton line	Southern Cross, Shepparton

== Gallery ==
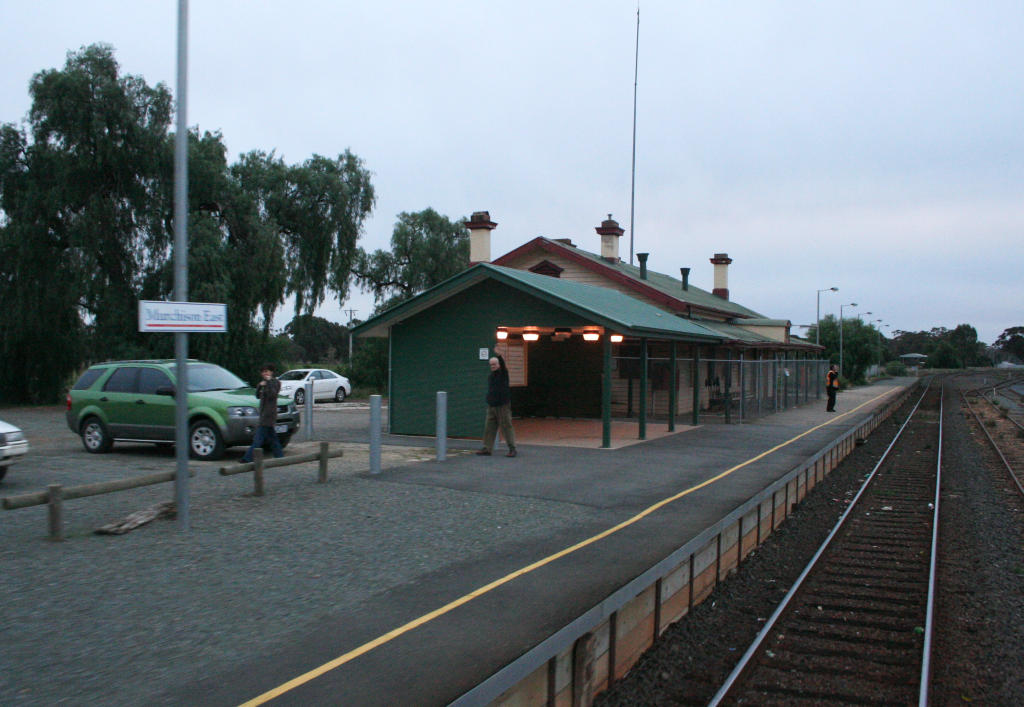
Northbound view of the station platform,
July 2008. The original station building has since been demolished due to a fire in 2014.
