= Kyabram railway station =

Former railway station in Victoria, Australia

Coordinates: 36°18′37″S 145°02′56″E

Kyabram

General information
- Line: Toolamba-Echuca
- Platforms: 1
- Tracks: 2

Other information
- Status: Closed

History
- Opened: 19 August 1887

Services
Preceding station	Disused railways	Following station
Merrigum	Toolamba-Echuca line	Tongala
	List of closed railway stations in Victoria	
Location

Kyabram railway station was opened on Friday, 19 August 1887. It is on the Toolamba–Echuca railway line, in Victoria, Australia.

== Status ==
The line has not been used for passenger services for some time, and even freight movements on this line are non-existent, with the line booked out of service.

== Infrastructure ==
The platform at Kyabram still exists in a reasonable condition, with a gravel car park. There is also a siding track still present at this location. Flashing lights were provided at the nearby Albion Street level crossing, located towards Toolamba, in 1972. The former toilet block was demolished in August 1986. The down end crossover points were spiked out of use around this time. In May 1988, the goods platform and storage shed were demolished. A number of sidings were abolished in 1991, including No. 3 road and the stock siding.
