= Wunghnu railway station =

Former railway station in Victoria, Australia

Coordinates: 36°09′17″S 145°26′05″E

Wunghnu
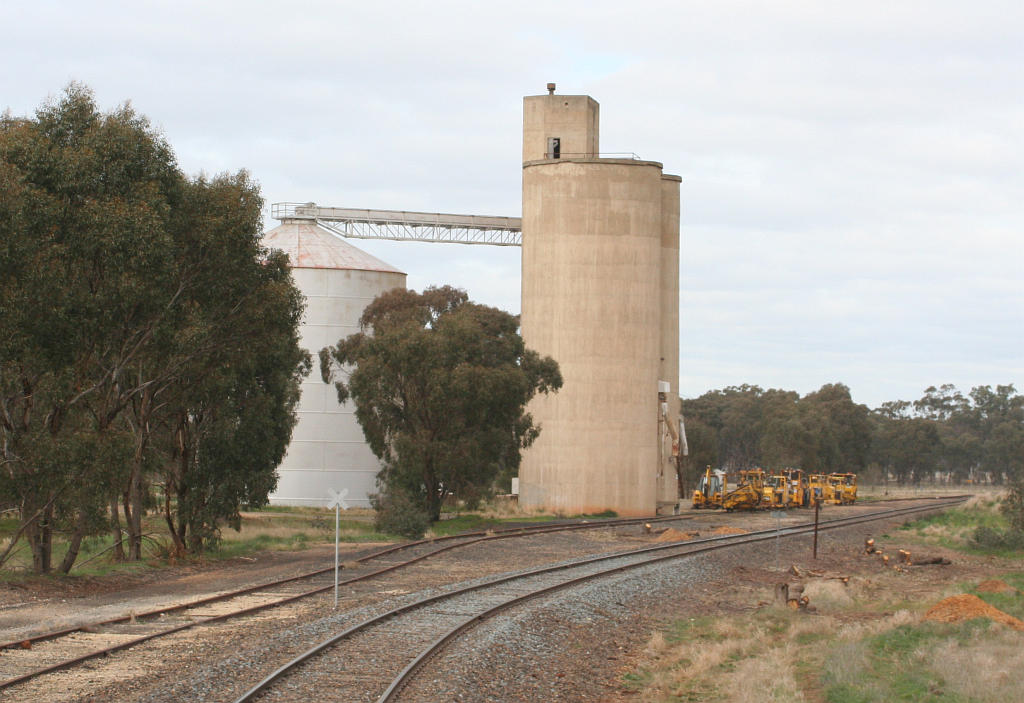
- Looking south, grain silos and loop siding, with stabled track machines

General information
- Line: Goulburn Valley
- Platforms: 0
- Tracks: 2

Other information
- Status: Closed

History
- Opened: 1881

Services
Preceding station	Disused railways	Following station
Tallygaroopna	Goulburn Valley line	Numurkah
	List of closed railway stations in Victoria	
Location

Wunghnu is a closed railway station on the Goulburn Valley line, in the township of Wunghnu, Victoria, Australia. The station opened at the same time as the railway from Shepparton to Numurkah on 1 September 1881, and was closed to freight in March 2003. The loop siding to the grain silos remains, and has been used to stable track machines such as ballast tampers.

The passenger platform was reduced in length to 79m in 1974.
