= Tallygaroopna railway station =

Former railway station in Victoria, Australia

Coordinates: 36°14′17″S 145°25′56″E

Tallygaroopna
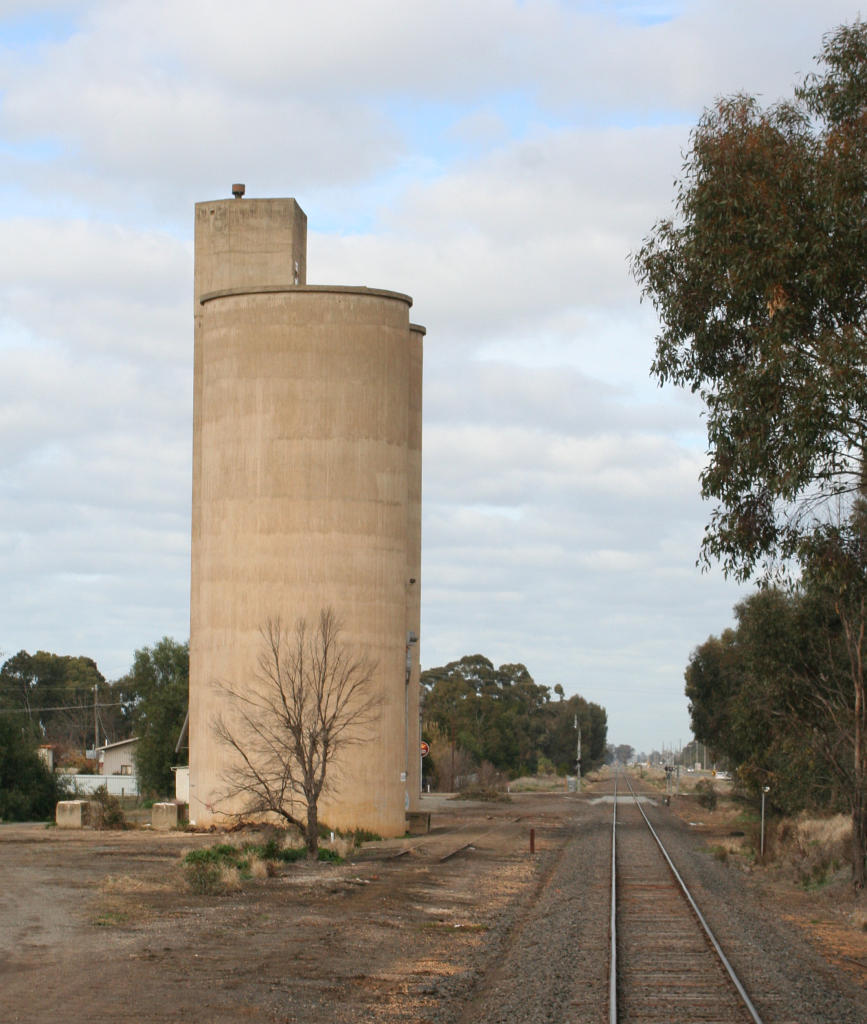
- Looking south, grain silos and removed siding. Platform was to the right

General information
- Line: Goulburn Valley
- Platforms: 0
- Tracks: 1

Other information
- Status: Closed

History
- Opened: 1881

Services
Preceding station	Disused railways	Following station
Congupna	Goulburn Valley line	Wunghnu
	List of closed railway stations in Victoria	
Location

Tallygaroopna is a closed railway station on the Goulburn Valley line, in the township of Tallygaroopna, Victoria, Australia. The station opened at the same time as the railway line from Shepparton to Numurkah on 1 September 1881. The passenger platform was shortened in length from 107.3m to 101.2m in 1973. The siding to the grain silos was lifted at an unknown date.
