= Cathkin =

Cathkin is a Scottish placename that now may mean:

- Cathkin, South Lanarkshire, a neighbourhood of Rutherglen near to the Braes, Scotland
- Cathkin Braes, the highest point in Glasgow, a site for mountainbikers and rallying point in the Radical War
- Cathkin High School, a state secondary school in Cambuslang near Cathkin
- Cathkin Park, a municipal park in Glasgow, formerly a major Scottish football ground (Third Lanark A.C.)
- Cathkin Park (1872–1903), an earlier ground of the above football club a short distance from the other
- Cathkin Peak, a South African mountain peak
- Cathkin, Victoria, a town in Australia
  - Cathkin railway station, now closed

== See also ==
- Catkin
