= Mooroopna railway station =

Railway station in Victoria, Australia

Mooroopna
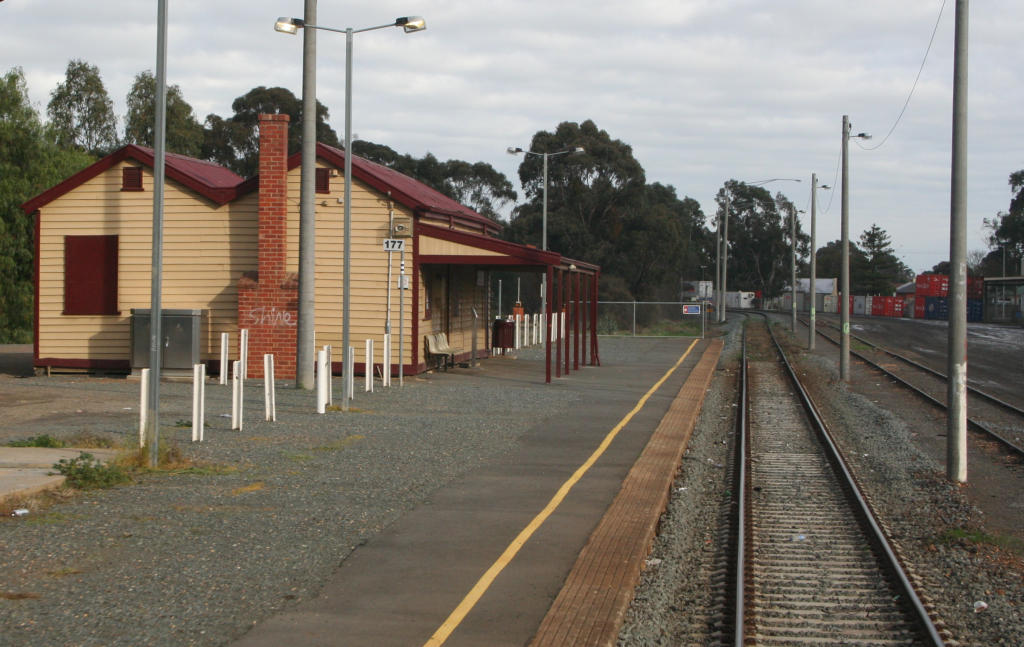
- Westbound view from the single station platform, July 2008

General information
- Location: Young Street, Mooroopna, Victoria 3629; City of Greater Shepparton; Australia
- Coordinates: 36°23′57″S 145°21′28″E
- System: PTV regional rail station
- Owner: VicTrack
- Operator: V/Line
- Line: Shepparton (Tocumwal)
- Distance: 177.00 kilometres from Southern Cross
- Platforms: 1
- Tracks: 2

Construction
- Structure type: Ground
- Parking: 10
- Accessible: Yes

Other information
- Status: Operational, unstaffed
- Station code: MPA
- Fare zone: Myki zone 13
- Website: Public Transport Victoria

History
- Opened: 13 January 1880; 146 years ago
- Rebuilt: August 2022

Services
Preceding station	V/Line	Following station
Murchison East towards Southern Cross	Shepparton line	Shepparton Terminus
Location
- Location within Victoria

Mooroopna railway station is a regional railway on the Tocumwal and Shepparton lines, part of the Victoria rail network. It serves the town of Mooroopna, in Victoria, Australia. Mooroopna is a ground-level unstaffed station, featuring one side platform. The station opened on 13 January 1880, with the current station provided in August 2022.

A siding for the SPC Ardmona fruit factory is located opposite the station, and is served by Pacific National freight services. All other sidings at the station were abolished in 1991.

== History ==
On 13 January 2018, a suspicious fire destroyed the station building in the early hours of the morning.

As part of the Regional Rail Revival project to upgrade the Shepparton line, the platform was extended to accommodate VLocity trains. The project was completed by August 2022, and included new lighting, seating, shelter and CCTV, as well an upgraded car park and upgraded paths leading to the station.

Demolished station Toolamba was located between Mooroopna and Murchison East.

== Platforms and services ==
Mooroopna has one platform. It is serviced by V/Line Shepparton line services.

Mooroopna platform arrangement
Platform	Line	Destination
1	Shepparton line	Southern Cross, Shepparton
