= Tongala railway station =

Closed railway station in Victoria, Australia

Coordinates: 36°15′07″S 144°56′59″E

Tongala

General information
- Line: Toolamba-Echuca
- Platforms: 2
- Tracks: 1

Other information
- Status: Closed

Services
Preceding station	Disused railways	Following station
Kyabram	Toolamba-Echuca line	Echuca
	List of closed railway stations in Victoria	
Location

Tongala is a closed railway station on the Toolamba–Echuca railway line, in Victoria, Australia, formerly serving the town of Tongala. Although the former passenger platform remains only as a mound, the former goods platform still exists in relatively good condition, with a crane still provided on the platform. A transport mural is located near the station site. A number of tracks and sidings were removed at the station in 1991. A freight service that served the nearby Nestlé factory with briquettes also ceased in July 1991.

Flashing lights were provided at the Henderson Road level crossing, located at the down end of the station, in 1973.
