= Congupna railway station =

Former railway station in Victoria, Australia

Coordinates: 36°18′3″S 145°25′55″E

Congupna
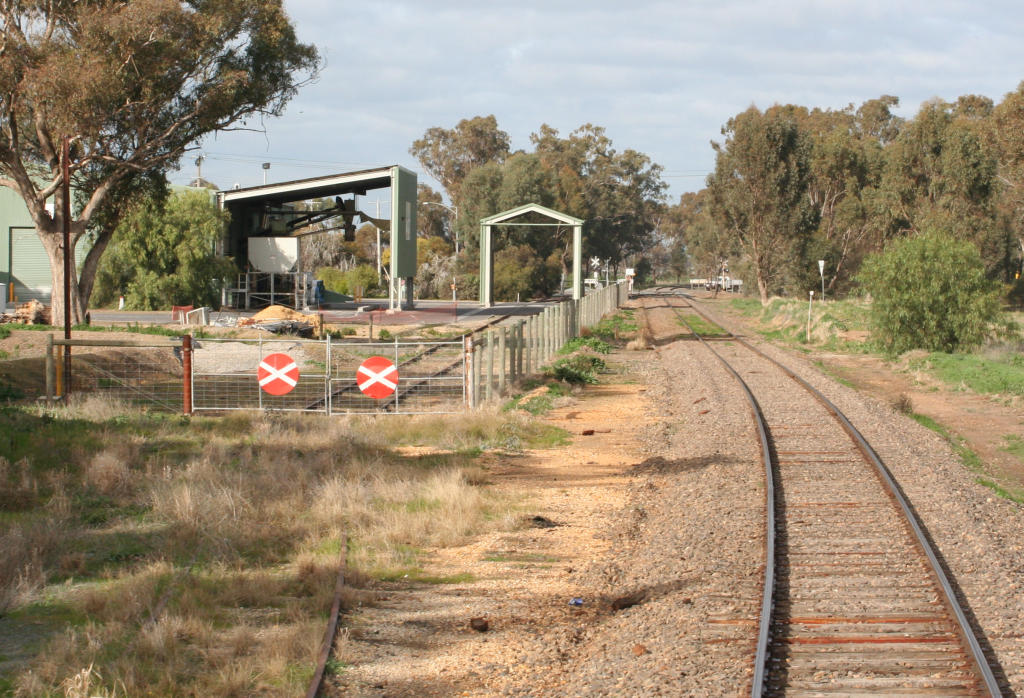
- Looking south, loop siding and fertilizer depot to left, platform mound to right

General information
- Line: Goulburn Valley

Other information
- Status: Closed

History
- Opened: 1881

Services
| Preceding station | Disused railways | Following station |
|---|---|---|
| Shepparton | Goulburn Valley line | Tallygaroopna |
| | List of closed railway stations in Victoria | |
Location

Congupna is a closed railway station on the Goulburn Valley railway line, in the township of Congupna, just north of Shepparton, Victoria, Australia. The station opened as Congupna Road at the same time as the railway from Shepparton to Numurkah on 1 September 1881, and was renamed Congupna in February 1968.

The platform was on the west side of the line, with the dirt mound remaining today. A rail served fertilizer depot was located on a loop siding across from the platform, but has not seen use since fertilizer traffic moved away from rail in the mid-2000s.

In November 1986, the staff locked points at the down end of the station were abolished, and replaced with an annett lock, with a staff/annett key exchange apparatus provided, to prevent unnecessary operation of the level crossing signals during operation.
