= Tatura railway station =

Former railway station in Victoria, Australia

Coordinates: 36°26′31″S 145°13′58″E

Tatura

General information
- Line: Toolamba-Echuca
- Platforms: 1
- Tracks: 1

Other information
- Status: Closed

History
- Closed: 8 April 1991

Services
Preceding station	Disused railways	Following station
Toolamba	Toolamba-Echuca line	Merrigum
	List of closed railway stations in Victoria	
Location

Tatura railway station is a closed railway station on the Toolamba–Echuca railway line, in Victoria, Australia, formerly serving the town of Tatura. The former platform mound remains adjacent to the large dairy farm at Tatura. The track contains a kink near the former station site, where the rail yard area once was. There is a semaphore signal at the up end of the station. The station officially closed on 8 April 1991.
