= Nagambie railway station =

Railway station in Victoria, Australia

Nagambie
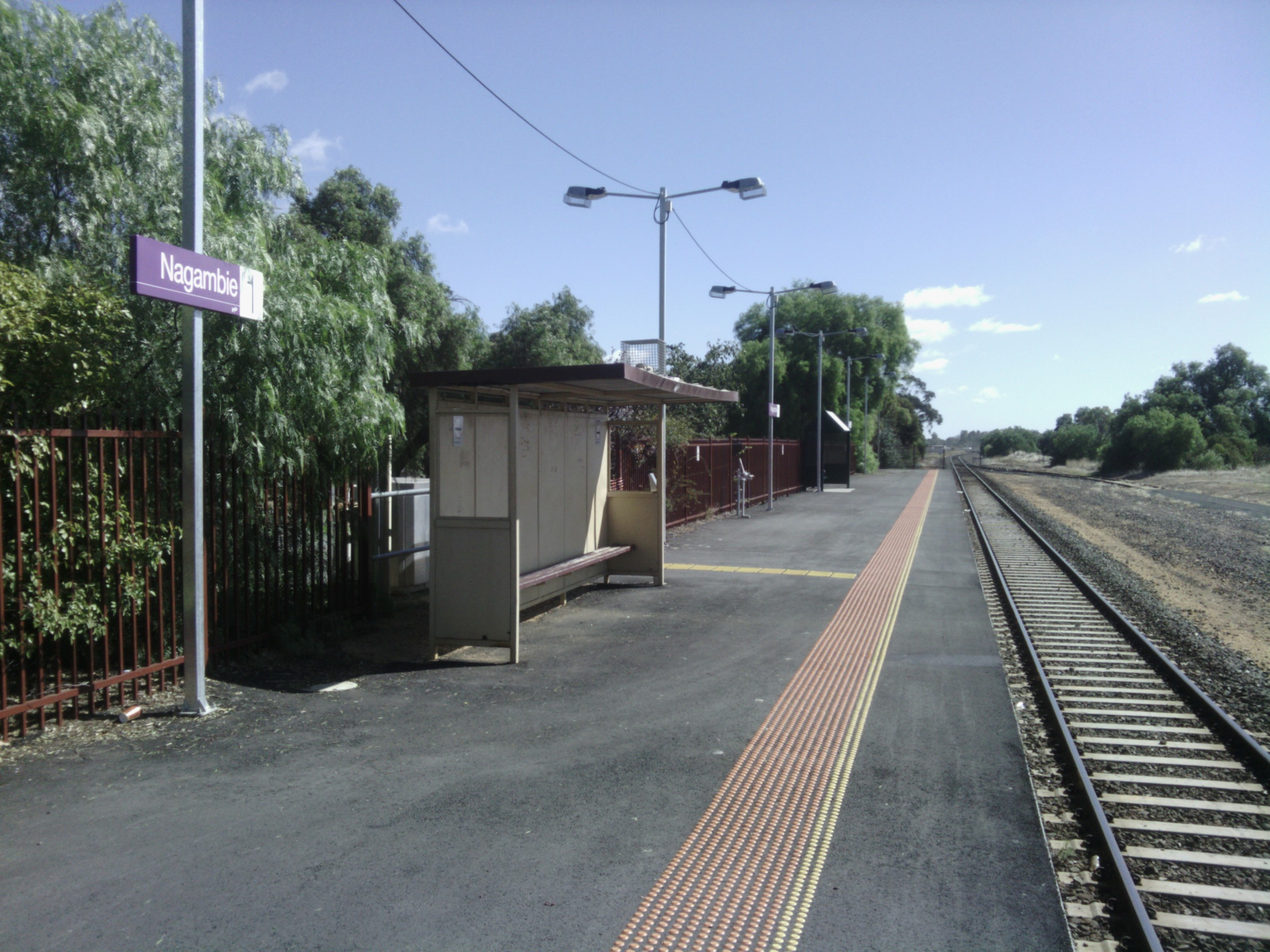
- Northbound view from station platform, March 2015

General information
- Location: Prentice Street, Nagambie, Victoria 3608; Shire of Strathbogie; Australia
- Coordinates: 36°47′08″S 145°09′37″E
- System: PTV regional rail station
- Owner: VicTrack
- Operator: V/Line
- Line: Shepparton (Tocumwal)
- Distance: 126.12 kilometres from Southern Cross
- Platforms: 1
- Tracks: 1

Construction
- Structure type: Ground
- Parking: Yes
- Accessible: Yes

Other information
- Status: Operational, unstaffed
- Station code: NGE
- Fare zone: Myki zone 8
- Website: Public Transport Victoria

History
- Opened: 13 January 1880; 146 years ago
- Rebuilt: 1991; August 2022

Services
Preceding station	V/Line	Following station
Seymour towards Southern Cross	Shepparton line	Murchison East towards Shepparton
Location
- Location within Victoria

Nagambie railway station is a regional railway on the Tocumwal and Shepparton lines, part of the Victoria rail network. It serves the town of Nagambie, in Victoria, Australia. Nagambie is a ground-level unstaffed station, featuring one side platform. The station opened on 13 January 1880.

Only a small passenger shelter is provided on the platform, with grain silos and fertiliser sheds located on a single siding west of the platform. The original station building was destroyed by fire in 1991.

As part of the Regional Rail Revival project to upgrade the Shepparton line, the station platform was extended to accommodate VLocity trains. The work was completed by August 2022, and included new lighting, seating, shelter and CCTV, as well an upgrade to the car park and paths leading to the station.

The closed station at Tabilk was located between Nagambie and Seymour, and the closed Wahring station was located between Nagambie and Murchison East.

== Platforms and services ==
Nagambie has one platform and is served by V/Line Shepparton line trains.

Nagambie platform arrangement
Platform	Line	Destination
1	Shepparton line	Southern Cross, Shepparton

== Gallery ==
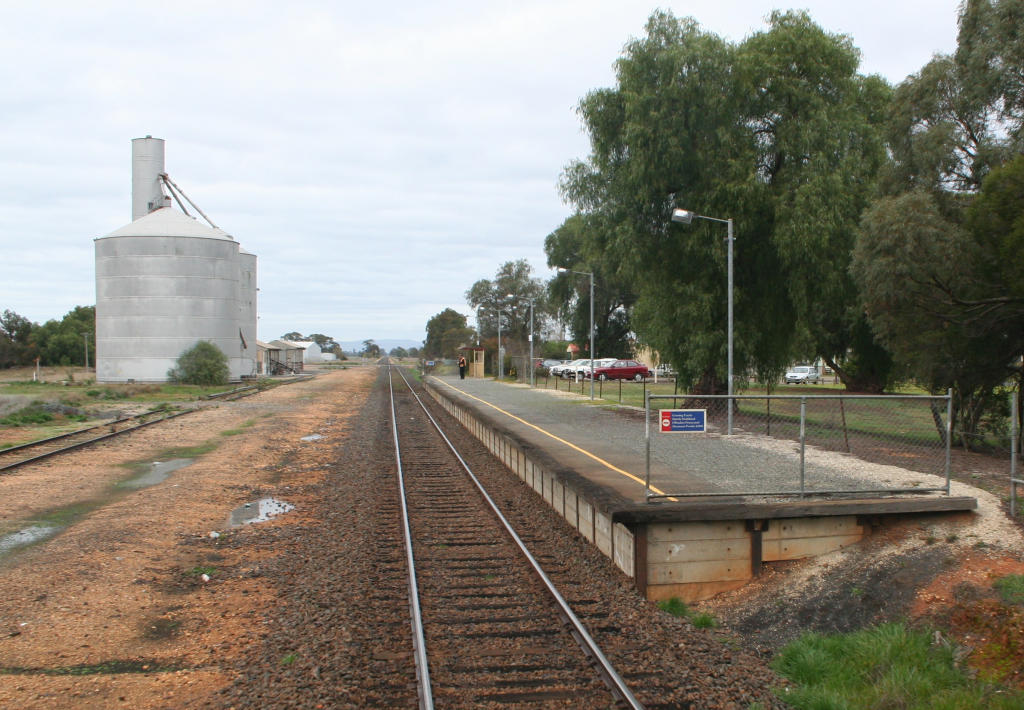
Southbound view of the station platform,
July 2008
