= Arcadia railway station =

Former railway station in Victoria, Australia

Coordinates: 36°33′51″S 145°19′59″E

Arcadia
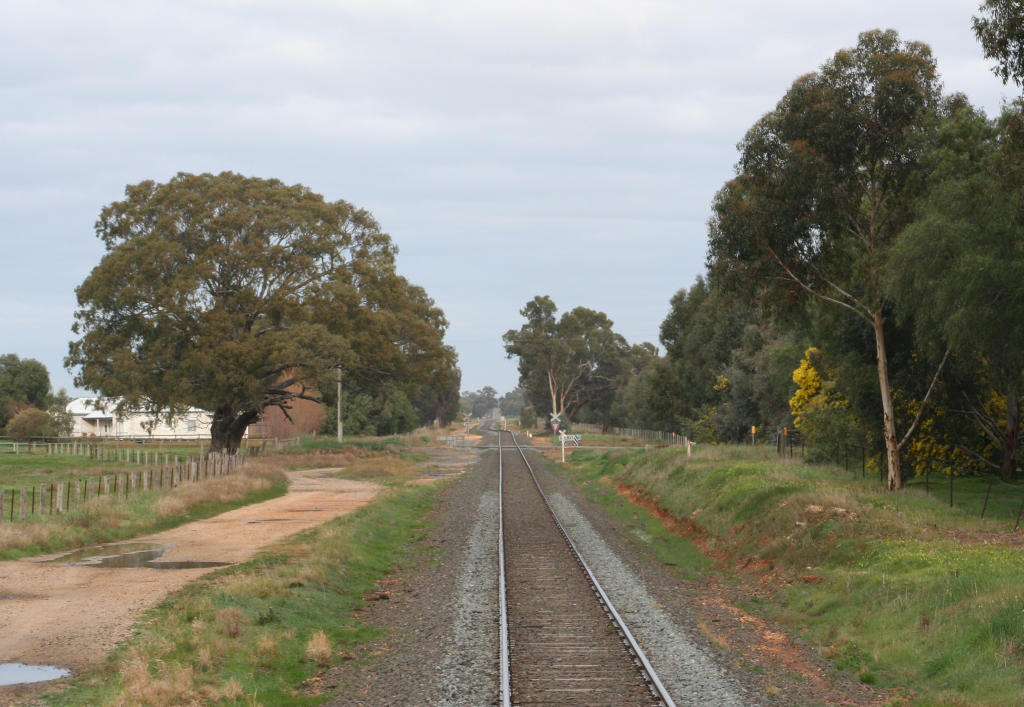
- Former station site, platform mound to the right

General information
- Line: Goulburn Valley

Other information
- Status: Closed

History
- Opened: 1880
- Closed: 1977

Services
Preceding station	Disused railways	Following station
Murchison East	Goulburn Valley line	Toolamba
	List of closed railway stations in Victoria	
Location

Arcadia is a closed railway station on the Goulburn Valley railway in the township of Arcadia, Victoria, Australia. The station opened at the same time as the railway from Mangalore to Shepparton on 13 January 1880 and closed on 30 June 1977. The platform was on the west side of the line, with only the dirt mound remaining today.
