= NGE =

NGE can mean:

- Nagambie railway station, Australia
- Nagoya Grampus Eight, a football club playing for J-League
- Nation of Gods and Earths or 5 % Nation, a non religious movement that views Islam as a culture and a way of life
- Natural genetic engineering
- NGE, an abbreviation for the N-Gage portable game console by Nokia
- NGe, a Belarusian alternative rock group
- Neon Genesis Evangelion, an anime/manga franchise by Hideaki Anno
  - Neon Genesis Evangelion, anime that originated the franchise
- New Game Enhancements, a set of changes to the computer game Star Wars Galaxies
- New Georgia Encyclopedia, a web-based encyclopedia about the US state of Georgia
