= Merrigum railway station =

Former railway station in Victoria, Australia

Coordinates: 36°22′18″S 145°07′46″E

Merrigum

General information
- Line: Toolamba-Echuca
- Platforms: 1
- Tracks: 1

Other information
- Status: Closed

Services
Preceding station	Disused railways	Following station
Tatura	Toolamba-Echuca line	Kyabram
	List of closed railway stations in Victoria	
Location

Merrigum was a railway station at Merrigum, on the Toolamba–Echuca line, in Victoria, Australia. All that remains of the station is the mound on which the platform stood, and a section of track placed in what was the rail yard.

Flashing lights were provided at the Kyabram Road level crossing in October 1973.
