= Toolamba =

- Town
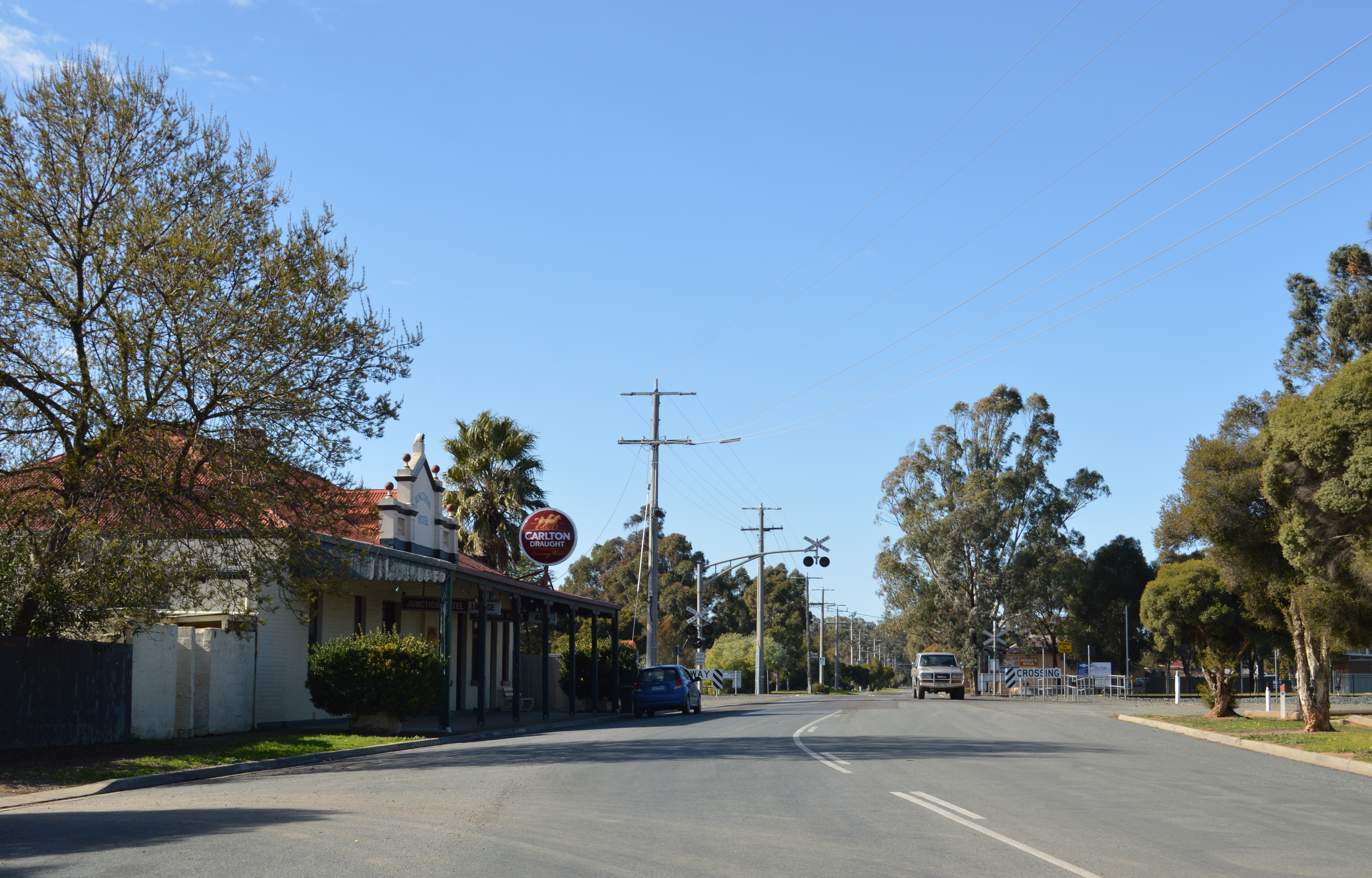
- Wren St, Toolamba with the Junction Hotel on the left

- Interactive map of Toolamba
- Coordinates: 36°29′S 145°19′E
- Country: Australia
- State: Victoria
- Region: Hume
- LGA: City of Greater Shepparton
- Location: 181 km (112 mi) N of Melbourne; 18 km (11 mi) S of Shepparton; 15 km (9.3 mi) SE of Tatura

Government
  - State electorate: Shepparton
  - Federal division: Nicholls

Population
  - Total: 822 (2021 census)
- Postcode: 3614

Toolamba /tuːˈlæmbə/ is a town in the Goulburn Valley region of Victoria, Australia. It is in the City of Greater Shepparton local government area, 181 kilometres (112 mi) north of the state capital, Melbourne. At the 2021 census, Toolamba and the surrounding area had a population of 822.

The Post Office opened on 1 January 1873. After the arrival of the railway this office closed and a Toolamba East office opened near the station, which was renamed Toolamba in 1895.

The railway station of the same name is located on the Goulburn Valley railway line opened in 1880, but was closed to passenger traffic in 1987. The station also serves as a junction with the line to Echuca. Currently the town has a General Store, Primary school (grades prep–6), a kindergarten, town hall and the Junction Hotel as well as a Bed and Breakfast.

== Education ==
Toolamba Primary School is a primary school of approximately 190 students located in the township of Toolamba, on the western side of the Goulburn River. The principal is Heather Kennedy. It includes a kindergarten.

A fire destroyed the primary school and kindergarten on Wednesday 3 February 2010. The school resumed back in Toolamba in March 2010 in a portable facility that was used until September 2012. The new school building was completed in October 2012.

== See also ==
- Toolamba railway station
