= Mangalore, Victoria =

Mangalore
- Town
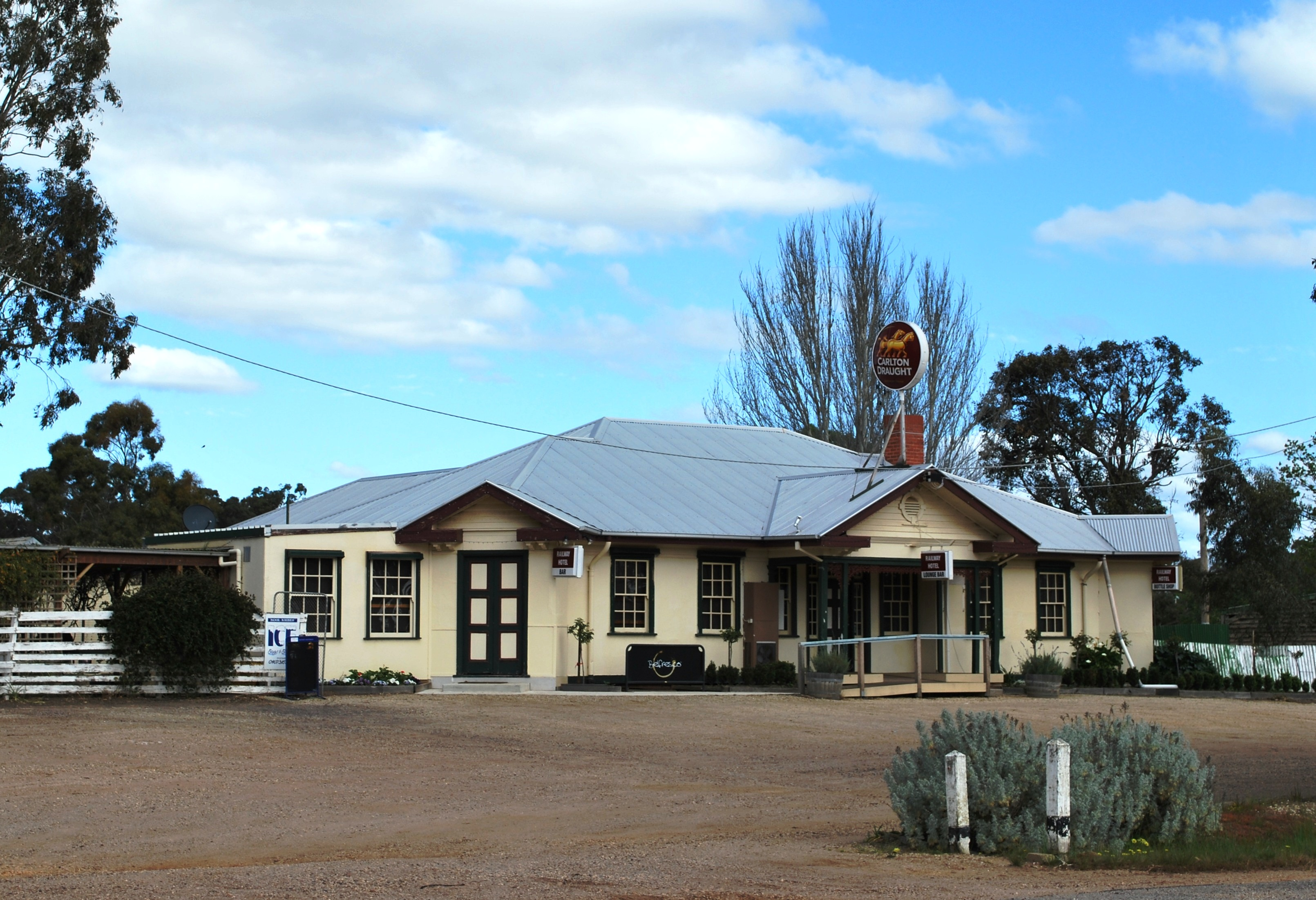
- Mangalore Hotel

- Coordinates: 36°53′18″S 145°11′3″E
- Country: Australia
- State: Victoria
- Region: Hume
- LGAs: Shire of Strathbogie; Shire of Mitchell
- Established: 1860s

Government
  - State electorate: Euroa
  - Federal division: Nicholls

Population
  - Total: 182 (2016 census)
- Postcode: 3663

Mangalore is a locality in the state of Victoria, Australia. The town is the Shire of Strathbogie local government area, and is 12 km north of Seymour and one hour and 20 min from Melbourne CBD by road. It is accessible by the Goulburn Valley Highway and the Hume Highway.

The area was named by Lieutenant Colonel Joseph Anderson, commandant of the penal colony on Norfolk Island, who took up 34,000 hectares (85,000 acres) of land in the area in 1838. He called the property after the Indian military station, Mangalore, commanded by his brother, General John Anderson.

Mangalore used to be served by the Mangalore railway station, which was situated where the line to Shepparton branched from the North East line to Albury. The station was closed in the early 1980s, and the junction was moved back to Seymour in 1989. During World War II, an airfield was built in the area, which has since been upgraded to accommodate international aircraft in case Melbourne Airport is unavailable.

== Climate ==
The Australian Bureau of Meteorology maintains an automatic weather station at Mangalore airport.

Climate data for Mangalore Airport (temperatures 1959–present; rainfall 1957–present)
Month	Jan	Feb	Mar	Apr	May	Jun	Jul	Aug	Sep	Oct	Nov	Dec	Year
Record high °C (°F)	46.3 (115.3)	46.1 (115.0)	39.9 (103.8)	35.5 (95.9)	28.4 (83.1)	21.7 (71.1)	22.0 (71.6)	26.5 (79.7)	31.8 (89.2)	36.3 (97.3)	42.2 (108.0)	44.0 (111.2)	46.3 (115.3)
Mean daily maximum °C (°F)	29.9 (85.8)	29.4 (84.9)	26.3 (79.3)	21.4 (70.5)	16.7 (62.1)	13.5 (56.3)	12.6 (54.7)	14.2 (57.6)	16.9 (62.4)	20.7 (69.3)	24.5 (76.1)	27.3 (81.1)	21.1 (70.0)
Mean daily minimum °C (°F)	14.3 (57.7)	14.3 (57.7)	12.3 (54.1)	8.6 (47.5)	6.0 (42.8)	3.9 (39.0)	3.2 (37.8)	3.9 (39.0)	5.3 (41.5)	7.3 (45.1)	10.0 (50.0)	12.0 (53.6)	8.4 (47.1)
Record low °C (°F)	2.6 (36.7)	3.0 (37.4)	1.5 (34.7)	−1.1 (30.0)	−4.1 (24.6)	−5.0 (23.0)	−5.6 (21.9)	−3.8 (25.2)	−3.6 (25.5)	−2.2 (28.0)	0.0 (32.0)	1.3 (34.3)	−5.6 (21.9)
Average rainfall mm (inches)	43.3 (1.70)	33.0 (1.30)	35.8 (1.41)	40.9 (1.61)	53.2 (2.09)	53.7 (2.11)	55.3 (2.18)	59.2 (2.33)	53.6 (2.11)	48.9 (1.93)	48.1 (1.89)	40.7 (1.60)	565.8 (22.28)
Average rainy days	5.2	4.8	6.0	7.0	10.8	12.7	15.1	14.5	11.5	10.0	8.1	7.0	112.7
Average afternoon relative humidity (%)	34	36	39	46	60	69	69	63	56	48	41	35	50
Source: Bureau of Meteorology
