= Mangalore railway station =

Former railway station in Victoria, Australia

Mangalore
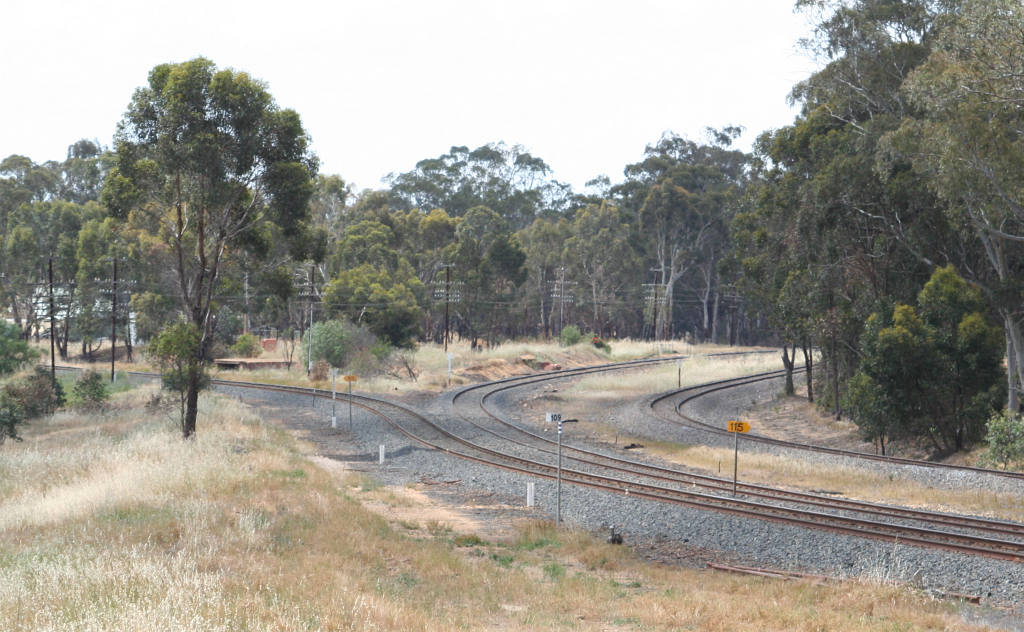
- Looking north towards the junction of the two lines and the former station, 2007

General information
- Coordinates: 36°56′09″S 145°10′36″E
- Lines: North East; Shepparton
- Platforms: 2
- Tracks: 2

Other information
- Status: Closed

History
- Opened: 20 November 1872
- Closed: 4 October 1981

Services
Preceding station	Disused railways	Following station
Seymour	North East line	Avenel
Seymour	Goulburn Valley line	Tabilk
	List of closed railway stations in Victoria	
Location

Mangalore is a closed station in the township of Mangalore, at the junction of the North East and Goulburn Valley railway lines in Victoria, Australia. The station was one of 35 closed to passenger traffic on 4 October 1981 as part of the New Deal for Country Passengers. The former station building was moved from the site, and currently sits in a yard on the way into nearby Avenel.

The station was located in a triangular wedge between the two lines, and was once the end of the double track on the line from Melbourne. The signal box at the station was closed in 1989 when the junction of the North East and Goulburn Valley lines was moved to Seymour, and the two lines were worked independently from there to their separation at Mangalore.
