= Koriella railway station, Victoria =

Former railway station in Victoria, Australia

Coordinates: 37°09′14″S 145°39′24″E

Koriella

General information
- Line: Alexandra
- Platforms: 1 Island platform
- Tracks: 2, with goods yard consisting of 3 tracks

Other information
- Status: Closed

History
- Opened: 16 September 1890
- Closed: 2 April 1973

Services
Preceding station	Disused railways	Following station
Cathkin	Alexandra line	Alexandra
	List of closed railway stations in Victoria	
Location

Koriella was a station on the short Alexandra branch line. When it opened in 1890, the station was called Alexandra Road and a post office operated there from 14 May 1891 until c.1902. The station's name changed to Lily in 1909, Rhodes in 1910, and Koriella in 1916.

The station was closed to all traffic on 2 April 1973, and the line closed on 8 November 1978.

== Infrastructure ==
The station consisted of a loop siding and a small island platform with a medium-sized tin passenger shelter. There was a goods yard with three tracks, including a goods shed.
