= Alexandra railway line =

Former railway line in Victoria, Australia

Alexandra

Overview
- Status: Former train line Now Great Victorian Rail Trail
- Owner: Victorian Railways (VR) (1888–1974); VR as VicRail (1974–1978)
- Locale: Hume (region), Victoria, Australia
- Termini: Cathkin; Alexandra
- Former connections: Mansfield
- Stations: 3 former stations

History
- Opened: 16 September 1890
- Completed: 28 October 1909
- Closed: 8 November 1978

Technical
- Line length: 14.318 km (8.897 mi)
- Number of tracks: Single track
- Track gauge: 1,600 mm (5 ft 3 in)
- Minimum radius: 200 metres (10 chains)
- Highest elevation: 281 metres (921 ft)
- Maximum incline: 1 in 30 (3.33%)

The Alexandra railway line is a closed 14-kilometre (9 mi) branch railway line situated in the Hume region of Victoria, Australia. Constructed by the Victorian Railways, it branches from the Mansfield line at Cathkin station, and runs east from the town of Cathkin to Alexandra. The line was primarily built to provide a general goods and passenger service to townships in the area.

== History ==
The line was opened in 2 stages from September 1890 to October 1909, and closed in November 1978.

The branch was opened from Cathkin to Koriella station on 16 September 1890, and to the terminus at Alexandra on 28 October 1909.

The branch was closed in 1978, at the same time as the Mansfield line. The rail reserve is now part of the Goulburn River High Country Rail Trail.

The Alexandra Timber Tramway and Museum has occupied the Alexandra station buildings since the 1970s and, since the line was closed, have operated a museum at the station site, dedicated to the timber industry in the local area.

== Stations ==
Station Histories
Station	Opened	Closed	Age	Notes
Cathkin	10 June 1890 || 8 November 1978 || data-sort-value=32,292 | 88 years			
Koriella	16 September 1890 || 2 April 1973 || data-sort-value=30,148 | 82 years	Formerly Alexandra Road / Lily / Rhodes		
Alexandra	28 October 1909 || 8 November 1978 || data-sort-value=25,213 | 69 years			
