= Alexandra railway station =

Former railway station in Victoria, Australia

Coordinates: 37.185061°S 145.714476°E

Alexandra

General information
- Line: Alexandra
- Platforms: 1
- Tracks: 1

Other information
- Status: Closed

History
- Opened: 21 December 1909
- Closed: 8 November 1978

Services
Preceding station	Disused railways	Following station
Koriella	Alexandra line	Terminus
	List of closed railway stations in Victoria	
Location

Alexandra is a former Victorian Railways station located in the town of Alexandra, on the Alexandra railway line in Victoria, Australia. The station was the terminus of the branch line from Cathkin to Alexandra along the Tallarook to Mansfield line. It was closed in November 1978.

The main weatherboard station building still remains at Alexandra Station, along with many other local railway and timber logging related buildings. The site is now the headquarters of the Alexandra Timber Tramway and Museum Inc. which maintains a short narrow gauge railway within the grounds of the station precinct. The Goulburn River High Country Rail Trail now ends at the Alexandra Timber Tramway.
