= Cathkin railway station =

Former railway station in Victoria, Australia

Coordinates: 37°09′03″S 145°35′00″E

Cathkin

General information
- Lines: Mansfield, Alexandra

Other information
- Status: Closed

History
- Opened: 10 June 1890
- Closed: 18 November 1978

Services
Preceding station	Disused railways	Following station
Molesworth	Mansfield line	Yarck
Terminus	Alexandra line	Koriella
	List of closed railway stations in Victoria	
Location

Cathkin is a former railway station in Cathkin, Victoria, Australia. The last passenger service was on 28 May 1977.
