= Toolamba railway station =

Former railway station in Victoria, Australia

Coordinates: 36°29′31″S 145°20′16″E

Toolamba
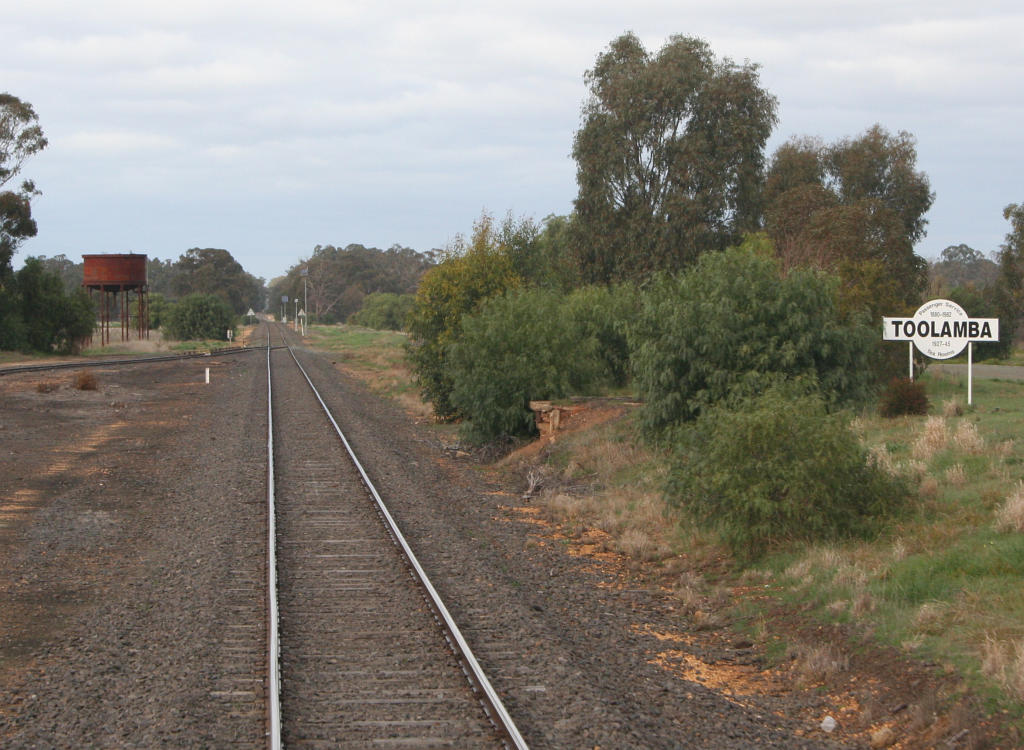
- Former station site, platform mound to the right, loop siding to the left, 2007

General information
- Line: Goulburn Valley
- Platforms: 0
- Tracks: 1

Other information
- Status: Closed

History
- Opened: 1880
- Closed: 1987

Services
Preceding station	Disused railways	Following station
Arcadia	Goulburn Valley line	Mooroopna
Junction	Toolamba-Echuca line	Tatura
	List of closed railway stations in Victoria	
Location

Toolamba is a closed railway station on the Goulburn Valley railway in the town of Toolamba, Victoria, Australia. The station opened as a junction at the same time as the railway from Mangalore to Shepparton on 13 January 1880, with the line to Tatura opening on the same day. The last passenger service to the station from Echuca ran on 2 March 1981 with Y class diesel locomotive Y161 hauling an ABE carriage and a C van. That consist had only been introduced a few months prior, with a DERM usually being rostered. Toolamba finally closed as a station on 20 December 1987.

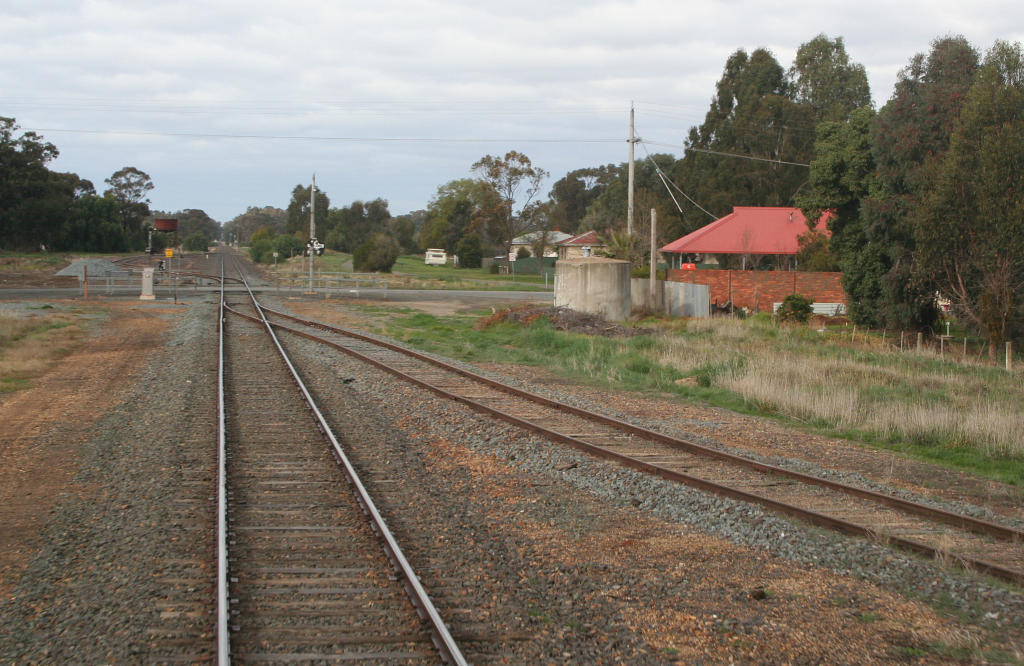
The junction with the Toolamba-Echuca line, 2008

The platform was on the west side of the line, with a dirt mound and the foundations of the signal box remaining today. A water tower is located at the Seymour end of the station. Until 2012, there was a 725-metre-long loop siding, usable as a crossing loop, opposite the former platform. The loop was disconnected at the up end in April 2021, leaving a dead-end siding with standing room of 258 metres.

The junction with the line to Echuca is on the north (Shepparton) side of the level crossing, facing Seymour.
