= Toolamba–Echuca railway line =

Railway line in Victroria, Australia

Toolamba - Echuca

Overview
- Status: Out of service
- Stations: 8

Service
- Type: Branch
- System: Freight only line

History
- Opened: 1880
- Completed: 1887
- Closed: 10 January 2020

Technical
- Line length: 67.178 km (41.742 mi)
- Number of tracks: 1
Route map

The Toolamba–Echuca railway is a broad-gauge cross-country rail link between the towns of Toolamba and Echuca in Victoria, Australia. As a railway route to and from Echuca, it provides an alternative to the usual route via Bendigo. The line has not been used for passenger services since 1981, and goods movements on the line are intermittent, with it being booked out of service at times. The line was re-opened for goods traffic while there was track work on the Shepparton line between Seymour and Shepparton. On 3 October 2013 the line was re-opened after an upgrade, but was booked out of service again in 2020 due to track conditions.

== History ==
During the Regional Fast Rail project, the line was used while work was being undertaken on the main line to Echuca via Bendigo. The line was also used by Freight Australia to send rice traffic from north of Echuca into Melbourne. On 3 October 2013 the line was re-instated for use by freight trains after an upgrade.

On 10 January 2020, the line was booked out of service due to sleeper condition, geometry faults and culverts failing.

There have been plans for the line to be converted to standard gauge to provide standard gauge access to Echuca, but they have not yet eventuated.

== Services ==
Aside from regular services, a dedicated railmotor was provided for school students in the region, starting at least as early as 1950 with a Lleyland double-ended railmotor. By 1961 the train departed Kyabram at 7:37am each school day, with about thirty stops at assorted stations and level crossings to collect about 200 students for Echuca; and if possible, each school had a specified carriage. The train was subjected to excessive wear and tear by the students, and had to be refurbished at Bendigo Workshops every school holiday period. At the end of school year on 19 December 1973 the return trip from Echuca was rescheduled to operate about two hours earlier, accommodating the truncated school end time. The consist of 27RM-62MT (due to reduced patronage) ran to Kyabram, collected stabled trailers and returned empty to Echuca; on the following day the motor and three trailers ran empty from Echuca to Bendigo, returning as 27RM-62MT-53MT-50MT on 4 February; it ran empty from Echuca to Kyabram at 7am the next day, entering service at 7.47am. Crews for the service were based at Echuca, usually travelling by the regular 6.25am Echuca to Toolamba service for the morning trip with special arrangements made for their return from Kyabram in the afternoon. By Tuesday 19 February 1974 the motor had been swapped for 20RM, due to a defective gearbox.

The last passenger service from Echuca station along the Toolamba–Echuca line ran on 2 March 1981, consisting of Y class diesel locomotive Y161, hauling an ABE carriage and a C van. That consist had only been introduced a few months prior, with a DERM usually being rostered. Toolamba finally closed as a station on 20 December 1987.

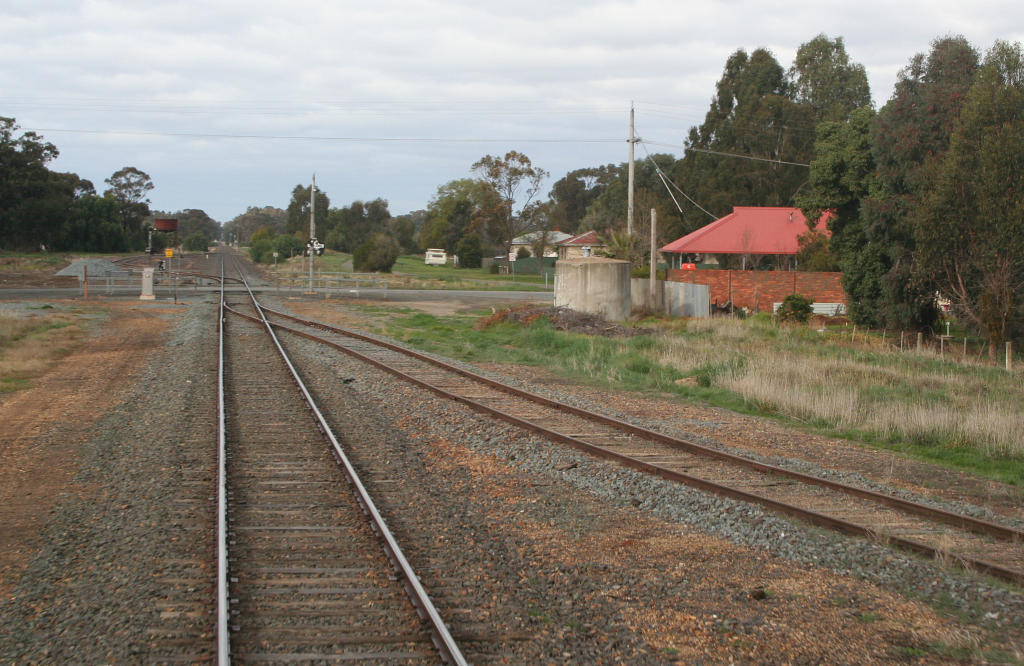
The Toolamba-Echuca line joins the main line at Toolamba

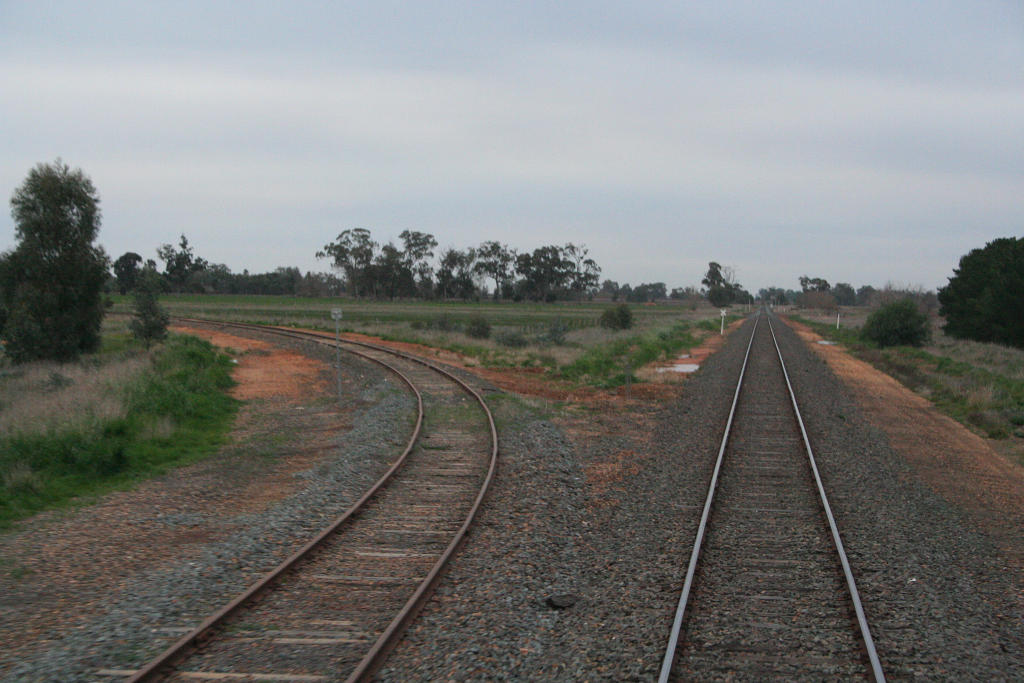
Lines towards Echuca & Shepparton diverge at Toolamba

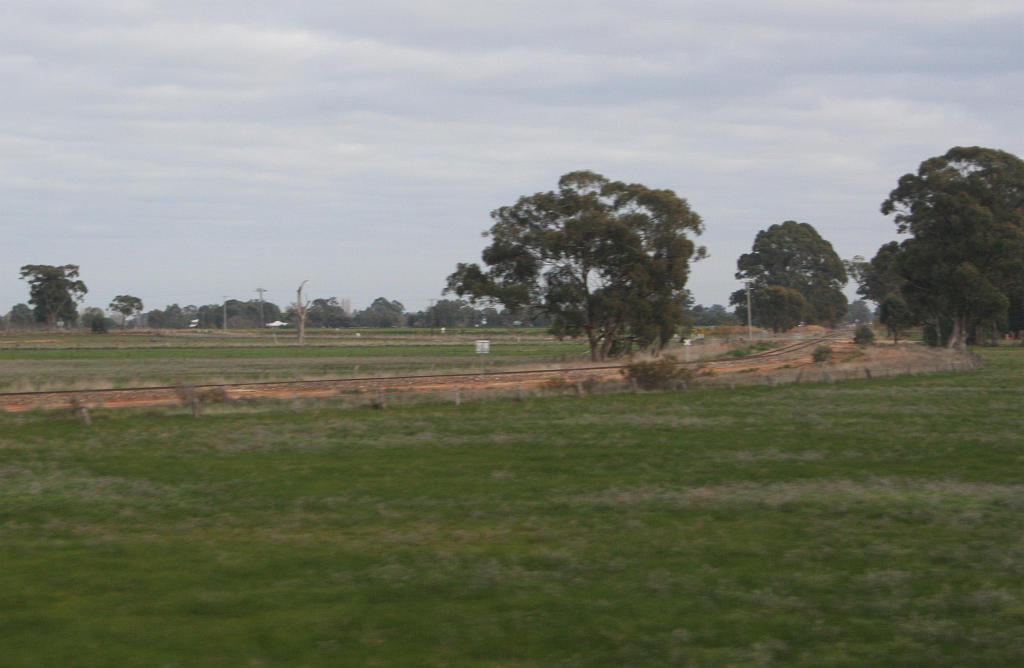
Toolamba-Echuca line heads westward at Toolamba
