= V/Line VLocity =

Australian passenger train

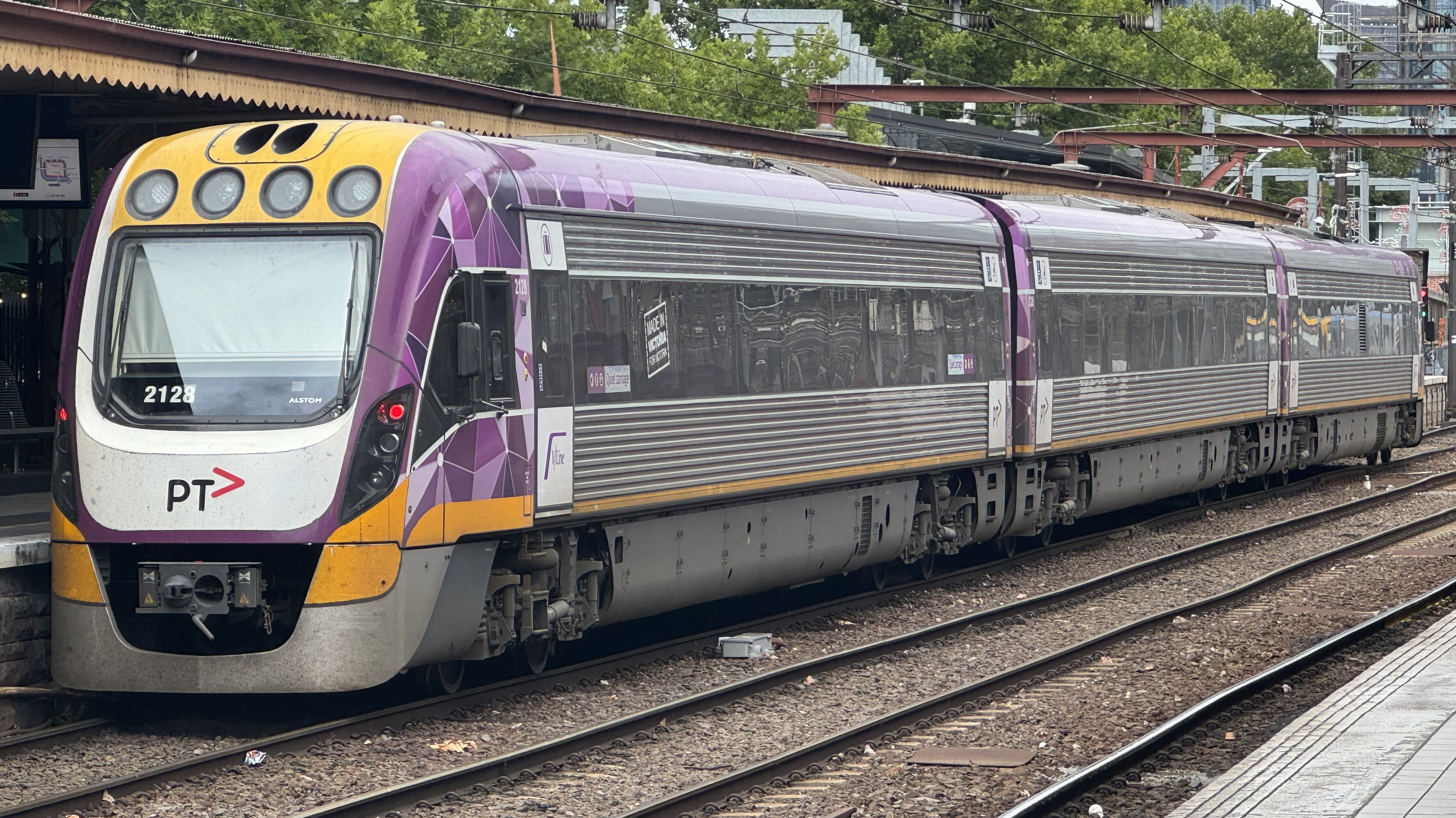
- VLocity set 3VL128 at Flinders Street station, December 2025

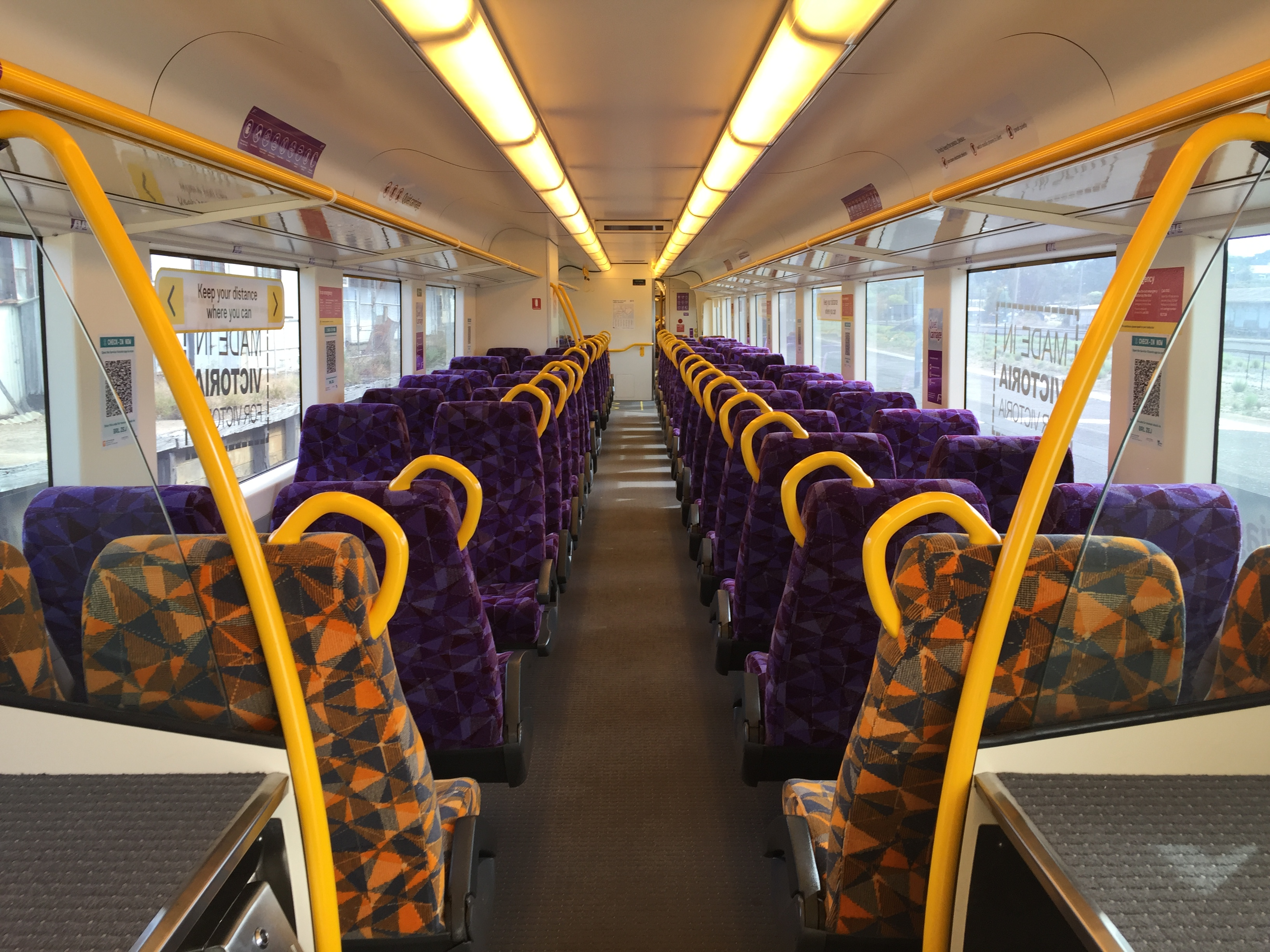
- Interior of a refurbished VLocity train, 2022
- Stock type: DMU
- In service: 2005–present
- Manufacturer: Bombardier Transportation/Alstom
- Built at: Dandenong
- Replaced: H, N, S and Z type carriages
- Constructed: 2004–2026
- Entered service: 22 December 2005
- Number built: 424 carriages
- Number in service: 423 carriages (141 3-car sets + 1 crash destroyed carriage)
- Number scrapped: 1 carriage (1129), (accident damaged) 1229 renumbered as 1241
- Formation: 3 semi-permanently coupled cars
- Fleet numbers: 3VL00–3VL28, 3VL30–3VL75, 3VR76–3VR79, 3VL80–3VL92 (Broad Gauge); 3VS93–3VS98 (Standard Gauge); 3VL99–3VL141 (Broad Gauge)
- Capacity: 148–224 fixed seats (per set)
- Operator: V/Line
- Depot: Southern Cross
- Lines served: Albury; Ballarat/Ararat/Maryborough; Bendigo/Echuca; Geelong/Warrnambool; Seymour/Shepparton; Traralgon/Bairnsdale

Specifications
- Car body construction: Stainless steel
- Train length: 75.75 m (248 ft 6 in) (3-car set)
- Car length: 25.25 m (82 ft 10 in)
- Width: 2.92 m (9 ft 7 in)
- Doors: 4 per carriage (2 per side)
- Maximum speed: 160 km/h (100 mph)
- Weight: 171 t (168 long tons; 188 short tons) (3-car set)
- Traction system: Diesel Multiple Unit
- Prime mover: 1 Cummins QSK-19R per carriage
- Power output: 484–559 kW (649–750 hp) per carriage
- Transmission: Voith T312 hydraulic transmission: three-speed fill-and-drain hydraulic transmission with a torque converter and 2 fluid couplings
- Acceleration: 0.9 m/s^{2} (3.0 ft/s^{2})
- Deceleration: 0.95 m/s^{2} (3.1 ft/s^{2}) (service); 1.12 m/s^{2} (3.7 ft/s^{2}) (emergency)
- Auxiliaries: Cummins 80 kW (110 hp) generator
- Power supply: 230vAC
- Coupling system: Scharfenberg coupler
- Track gauge: 1,600 mm (5 ft 3 in) Victorian broad gauge (133 sets); 1,435 mm (4 ft 8 1/2 in) standard gauge (6 sets)

The V/Line VLocity, sometimes called the VLocity 160, (Note: An early spelling of the name, used in V/Line publications, was V'Locity.) is a diesel multiple unit (DMU) train built in Dandenong by Bombardier Transportation and, later, by Alstom, for V/Line, the regional rail operator in the Australian state of Victoria. Continuously in production since 2003, the VLocity is the highest-speed train in the V/Line fleet, with a top speed of 160 km/h (100 mph). As of August 2026, all 141 Vlocity sets have entered service.

== History ==
=== Design origins and testing ===
To honour a commitment made when it was awarded the V/Line franchise, National Express requested tenders in early 2000 for 29 two-carriage diesel multiple unit trains. The order, which coincided with the Regional Fast Rail project then being undertaken by the state government, was awarded to Adtranz's Dandenong rolling stock factory in mid-November with a value of A$410,000,000. The contract was extended to 38 two-car units and an initial fifteen-year maintenance contract. By the time the first was delivered, the V/Line franchise had reverted to the state government, and Adtranz had been taken over by Bombardier Transportation.

The design was an evolution of the Xplorer/Endeavour railcars. Although Bombardier originally intended to use the same body shell design as the Endeavour, difficulties with the aerodynamic drag characteristics of this shape for the intended 160 km/h (99 mph) operational speed of the VLocity led to a complete redesign of the train body. Ultimately, the VLocity was designed concurrently with the B series being developed for Transperth, resulting in a number of shared design elements.

The original plan was for the 29 sets to be fitted with 2+3 seating, for a total capacity of 173 passengers per two-carriage set. However, in February 2003, that was changed to 144 seats in a 2+2 formation.

In 2003, it was announced that the units would be built in Bombardier's Dandenong factory, with the bogies to be constructed at Bombardier's Derby Litchurch Lane Works in England, and the control system to be supplied by Bombardier's plant in Västerås, Sweden. The first unit was completed in July 2004, and testing began shortly after. The trains were tested at 160 km/h (99 mph) for the first time on 17 September, when then-Premier Steve Bracks joined a test run along a 30 km (19 mi) route from Warragul to Moe.

Safety improvements were suggested at various stages in the development of the VLocity. For example, after the Cairns Tilt Train derailment in Queensland and the Waterfall accident in New South Wales, two very similar incidents where a train derailed when travelling too fast around a curve, the State Government announced in December 2004 that the Train Protection & Warning System (TPWS) would be installed on Regional Fast Rail lines and VLocity trains. In August 2005, the State Government commissioned an investigation into the fitting of seat belts on the trains, although the concept was considered potentially expensive and technically challenging.

Testing revealed noise levels were too high in the cabin, delaying the introduction of the trains into service while the completed sets were modified.

=== Into service ===
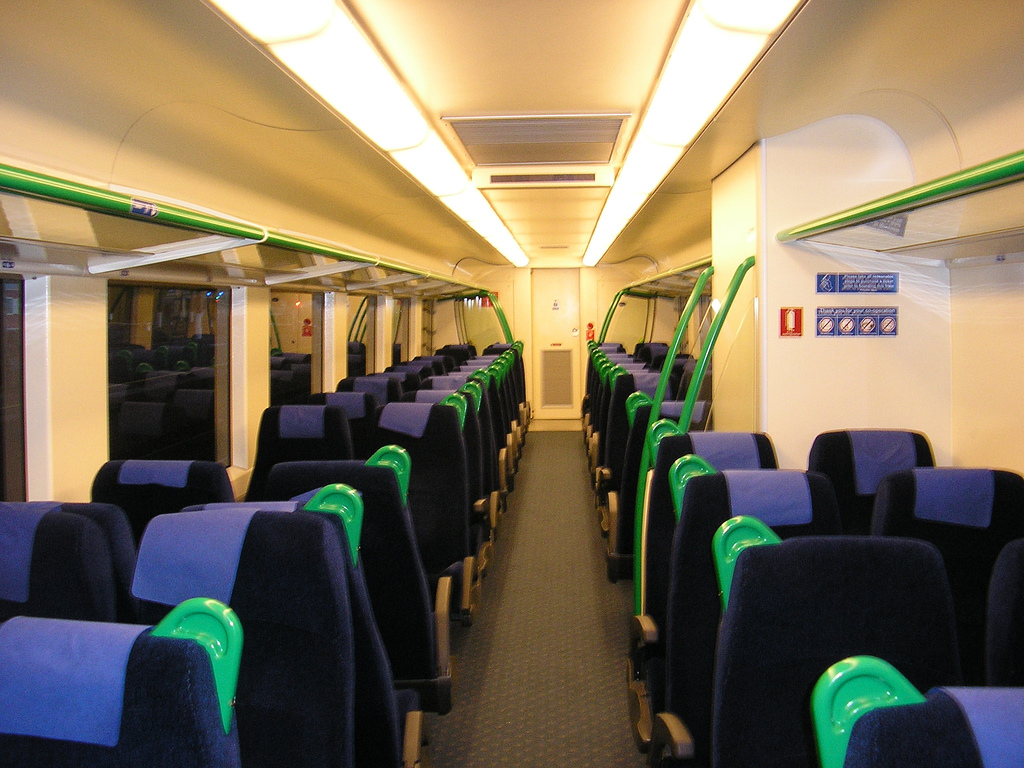
Interior of VLocity 2VL24 prior to refurbishment, 2006

The VLocity was introduced into service on the Ballarat line on 22 December 2005, with Bracks and Transport Minister Peter Batchelor travelling on the inaugural service from Southern Cross station. An unveiling ceremony was held at Ballarat and the train returned as a regular service. Services on the Geelong and Bendigo lines followed on 3 February 2006 and 24 February 2006 respectively. Services to Traralgon and Seymour were introduced in September 2006. A timetable allowing the VLocity to operate at its 160 km/h designed top speed was introduced on 3 September, despite allegations by the State Opposition of ongoing problems with the TPWS. In addition, the Ararat and Echuca services are operated by VLocitys. From 2010, one Ballarat line service each day was extended to Maryborough.

In 2005, the VLocity received an Australian Design Award, the first rail vehicle to do so, as well as an accolade from Engineers Australia.

On 10 November 2008, seven-carriage-long VLocity trains (2 x 2-carriage + 1 x 3-carriage sets) commenced regular operation on peak-hour Geelong line services. Previously, the longest trains had been six carriages long (3 x 2-carriage sets). With the introduction of fixed 3-carriage sets it was no longer possible to run 7-carriage trains but, in June 2022, a limited number of 9-carriage trains began running between Southern Cross and Wyndham Vale during peak times. There are also plans to run 9 car services to Melton until the Metro network is extended there when the line from Sunshine to Melton is eventually electrified.

=== Additions to the fleet ===
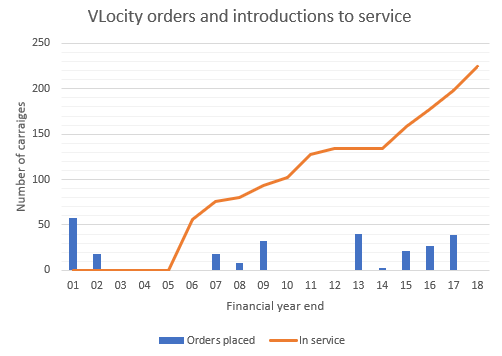
Chart showing the number of VLocity carriages ordered and in service at the end of each financial year from 2001 to 2018

After the initial order of 38 units, a further two VLocity units were later ordered to bring the total to 40, along with 22 new intermediate trailers to be inserted in the middle of existing VLocity sets. The first 14 were promised during the 2006 State Election, and the order was placed in December the same year. The order for the next eight was announced on 12 October 2007.

In July 2008, the State Government ordered nine new 3-car units, and an additional intermediate car to be inserted into an existing 2-car unit, with an extra four carriages added in February 2009. The final unit of the order was delivered in September 2011.

With the availability of improved technologies for train control, from mid-2012, sets 3VL30, 3VL40 and 3VL50 were selected by Bombardier as test sets for equipment upgrades, in order to minimise the number of sets containing non-standard systems.

In November 2012, the State Government announced an additional 40 carriages would be delivered between 2014 and 2016. The order comprised seven additional 3-car sets plus 19 intermediate cars to increase the remaining 2-car sets to 3-cars.

In March 2014, the order for 40 carriages was increased to 43. Further orders were placed for 21 carriages in May 2015 and 27 carriages in April 2016. All 2-carriage VLocity sets had been converted to 3-carriage sets by May 2018.

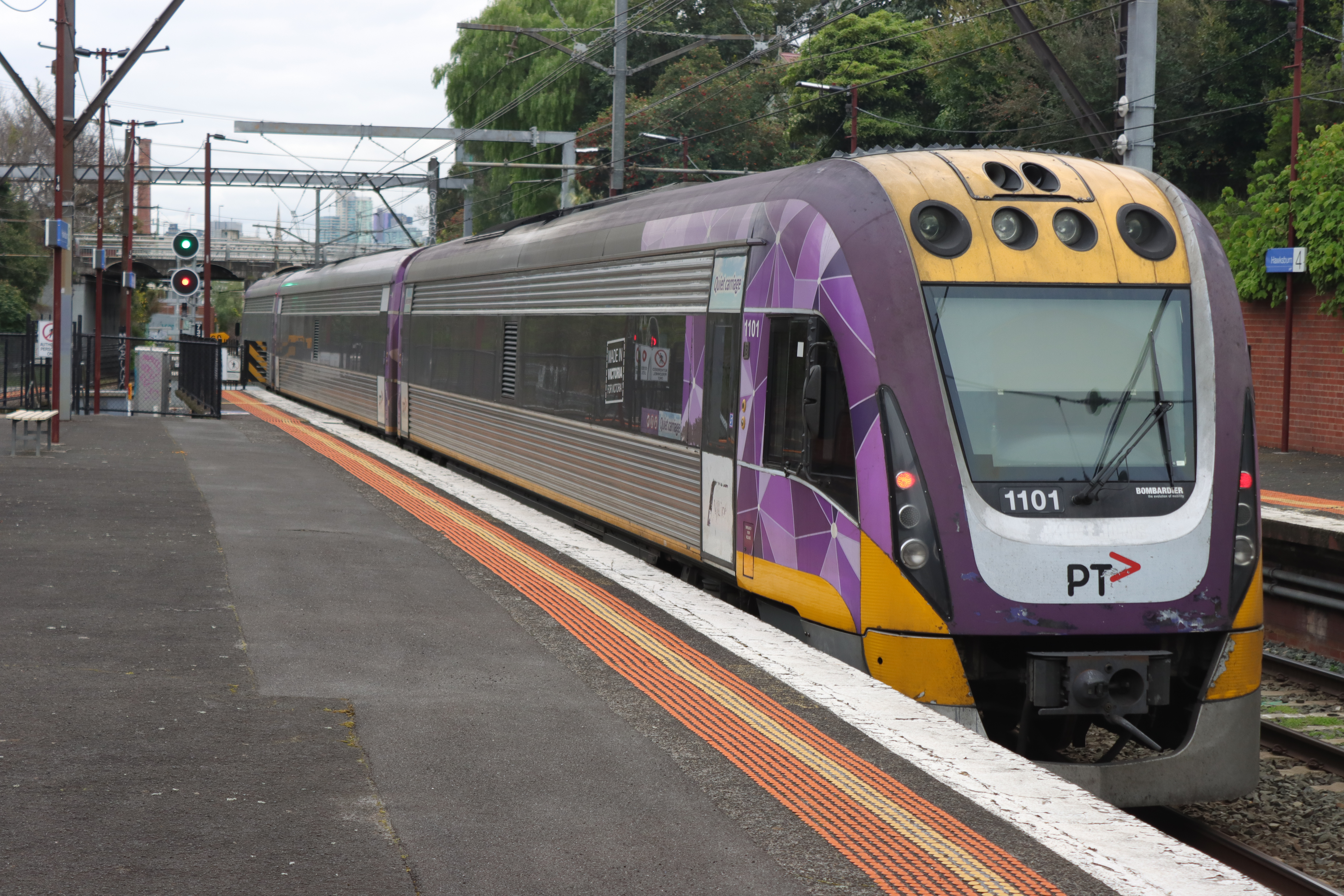
An original VLocity train, 3VL01, at Hawksburn Station, August 2023

In December 2017, a further nine sets were ordered. Once all were delivered, the fleet comprised 88 3-car sets. Of these, sets 76-79 were of a modified configuration, with a single toilet per three-carriage set instead of two, improvements to CCTV, downrating of the engines to 650 hp (480 kW) each for fuel economy and altered standing and seating arrangements. Sets from 80 to 88 reverted to two toilets with modified seating and a different front to accommodate a safer driving cabin. As of 6 November 2020 units 80-88 had entered revenue service.

After jockey Michelle Payne won the 2015 Melbourne Cup horse race riding Prince of Penzance, becoming the first female jockey to win the race, set 3VL9 was named Michelle Payne in honour of her regional Victorian ancestry. The set was the first and thus far only VLocity to be named and the first V/Line train to be named since the Sprinters in the late 20th century.

In the 2018 Victorian state election campaign, the Andrews government promised that, if re-elected, it would place an order for 18 additional three-car VLocity sets to be delivered from 2021.

In the 2022 Victorian state election campaign, the Andrews government promised that, if re-elected, it would place an order for an additional 23 three-car VLocity sets, as part of a promise to boost regional weekend services. The government also committed to introducing nine-car VLocity trains to service the Melton railway line in Melbourne's west. Production of the 23 sets began in March 2024. When completed, there will be a fleet of 141 three car VLocity sets on the V/Line network on the current confirmed contract.

The final 3 car VLocity set (VL141) on the current contract entered revenue service in July 2026, as of 3 August 2026 no announcements on building more units have yet to be made by any political party with a State Election due in November 2026.

=== Wheel wear restrictions ===
In January 2016, V/Line removed approximately a quarter of VLocity units from service after identifying unusually high rates of wear to wheel flanges. Compared to a normal rate of 0.7–1.0 millimetre per month (0.028–0.039 in/month), Bombardier's service regime noted a maximum wear rate of 2.6 mm/month (0.10 in/month). Although unusual wear patterns had been observed since December of the previous year across the V/Line fleet, then-V/Line CEO Theo Taifalos ordered the withdrawal of the most badly affected units for safety reasons.

On 15 January 2016, a VLocity set failed to activate boom gates at the Progress Street level crossing in Dandenong. This led Metro Trains to ban all sets from operating on suburban lines until the issue had been resolved. The combined restrictions on the VLocity fleet led to the daily cancellation of nearly 70 V/Line services from mid-January.

By the beginning of March, Bombardier had increased its capacity to re-machine affected wheels, and track identified as potentially contributing to the wheel wear situation had been reprofiled; as a consequence, VLocity units were gradually returned to service.

In April, a report by the Institute of Railway Technology at Monash University identified tight curves and an inadequate track lubrication on the newly opened Regional Rail Link, particularly along the North Melbourne Flyover near North Melbourne Station, which was upgraded as part of the project as a means of allowing V/Line services to access Platforms 1–8 at Southern Cross without needing to use the metropolitan tracks, as the root cause of the increase in wheel wear, and suggested that the relatively stiff suspension of the VLocity was the reason it had been most severely affected.

=== Design evolution ===
The New Generation Rollingstock ordered for Queensland Rail from Bombardier, although built in India, were based on the VLocity design and the 4000 class EMU used by Adelaide Metro, which was itself based on the VLocity shell and assembled in the same Dandenong factory as the VLocity sets. The Transperth B Series Train is closely related to the VLocity because both were designed at the same time by the same company.

A 2016 asset management report presented by V/Line noted that the VLocity would be unsuitable for higher passenger loads without a complete body redesign, and acknowledged that the operational performance of the VLocity was hampered by the inferior acceleration of V/Line's locomotive-hauled fleet. The 2016–17 Victorian budget allocated funds for a project to redesign the VLocity for long-haul services, particularly those to Shepparton, Warrnambool and Albury/Wodonga.

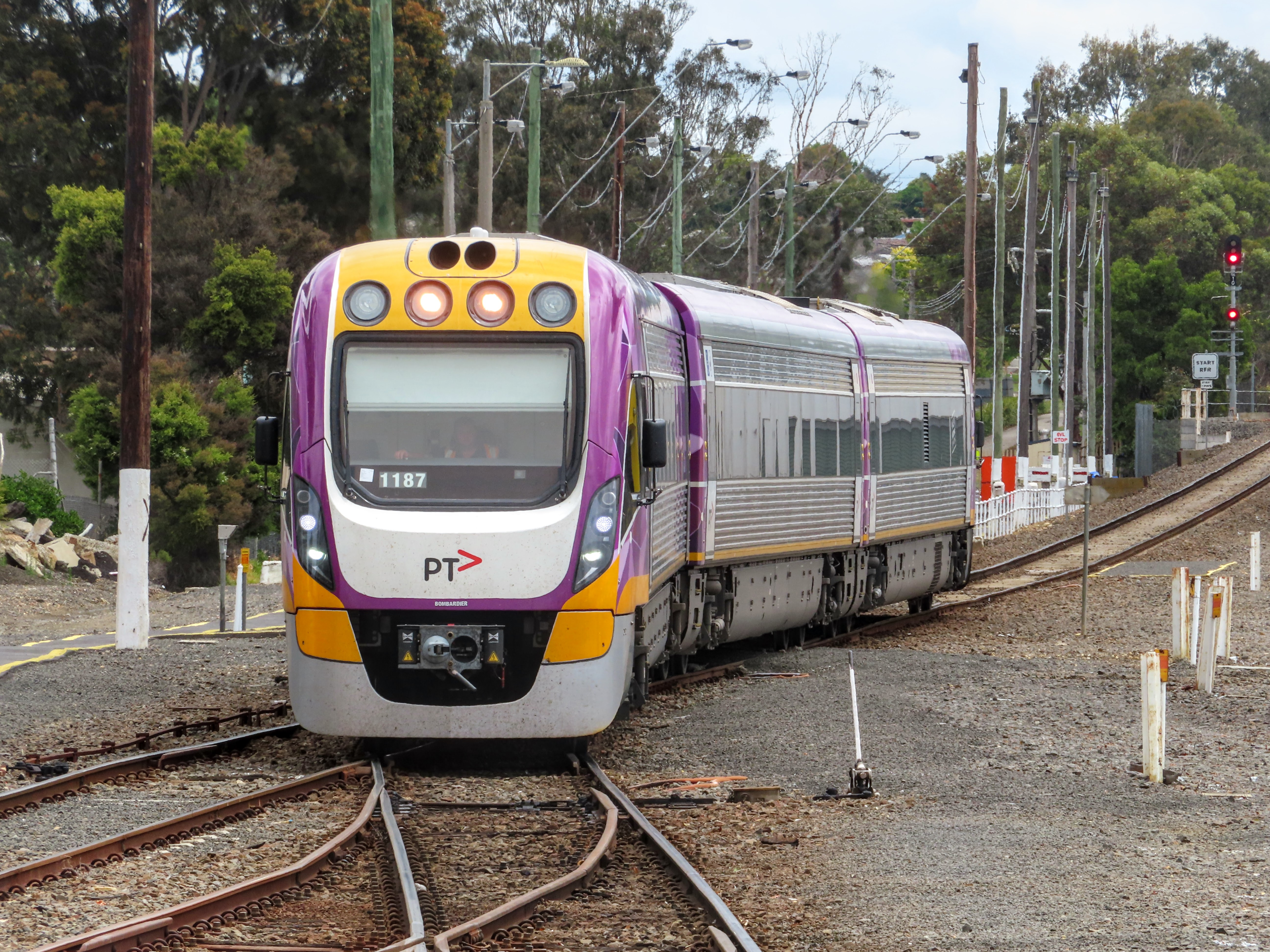
V/Line Next-generation VLocity 3VL87 arriving at Traralgon, 2020

By late 2017, design work had begun on modifications to the interior for units 3VR76-3VR79.

Many of the changes were required for improved compliance with the Disability Discrimination Act. For the later order of 3VL80 and above, more significant alterations to the crash protection in the driver's cabin were introduced.

In October 2018, the state government announced that a new interior layout would be introduced on units 3VR76-3VR79 and 3VL80-3VL88 with 14 extra seats per three-carriage set, at the expense of removing a toilet and bike storage rack from each set. Cycling lobby groups criticised the new layout, but the government argued that the sets would be restricted to short-distance routes where the additional capacity would be valuable.

The first of the updated type entered service in August 2019.

The current VLocity fleet is restricted to a maximum 3-carriage length due to the capacity of the various maintenance facilities for them around the state. Extending them to 4-, 5- or 6-carriage fixed sets, although technically possible, would be difficult to maintain without splitting longer fixed sets so they could fit on things such as whole-of-train lifting hoists.

=== Introduction to long-distance services ===
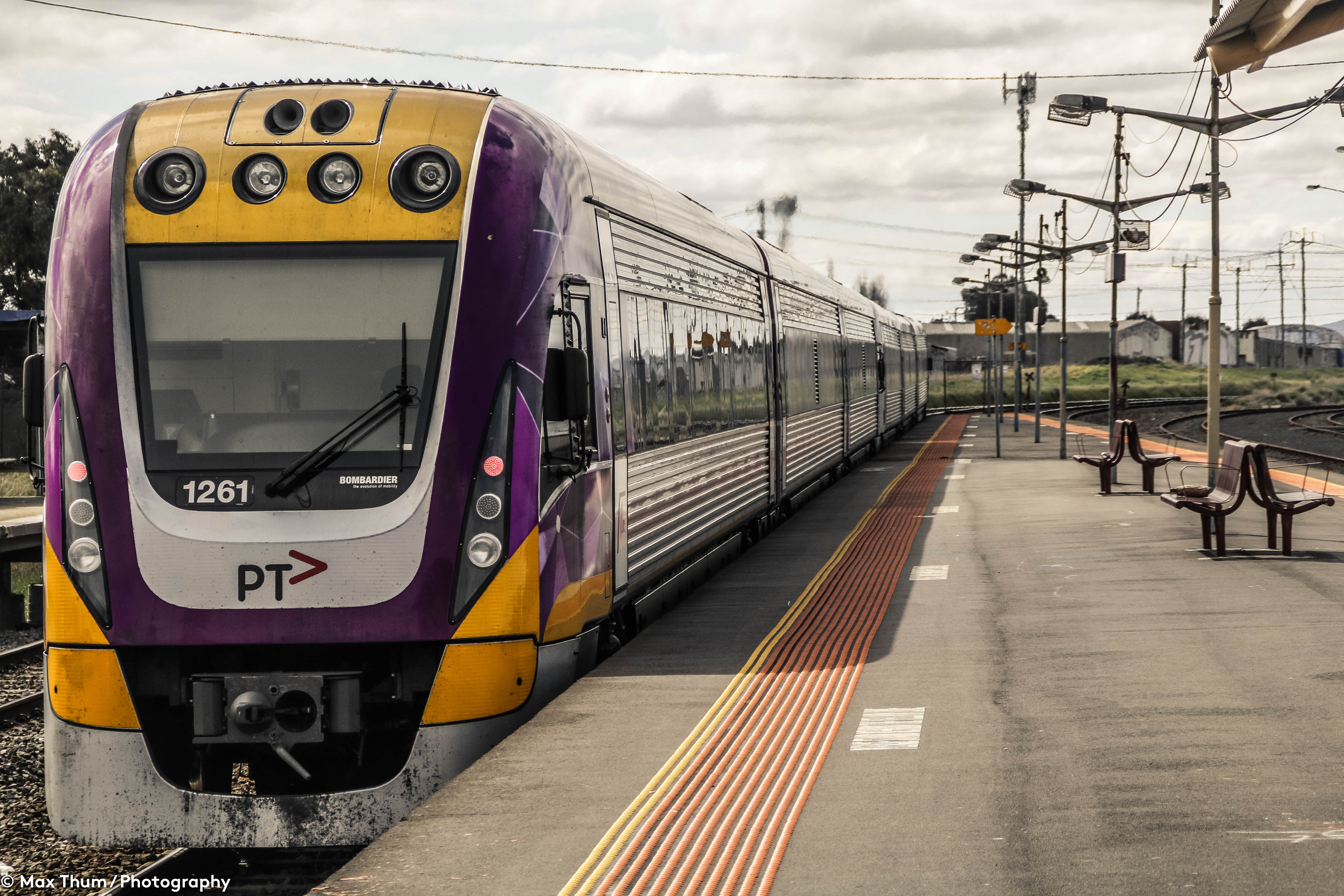
V/Line VLocity 3VL61 at North Shore, September 2017

In the lead-up to the 2018 Victorian election, opposition leader Matthew Guy announced that the Coalition would order 16 6-car VLocity variants from Bombardier for dedicated long-distance operation, with catering and first class facilities, but the Coalition did not win the election.

From May 2018, improvements to level crossing infrastructure saw VLocity test runs to Bairnsdale, ahead of an introduction to revenue service on the line later in the year. At the same time, government representatives announced that the long-haul variant of the VLocity would include onboard refreshment facilities and improved seats. A media event was held at Bairnsdale in July of that year, at which it was announced that two of the three daily Bairnsdale services would be run by VLocity trains.

In May 2018, the Rail Tram and Bus Union (RTBU) said it had received confirmation that a buffet facility would be included in new intermediate carriages, added to existing sets to form 4-car trains for long-distance services. Although the four-car configuration was never implemented, that plan may account for the unique 15xx numbering of the TMC buffet-equipped trailer cars, compared to the normal TM 13/23xx number of standard trailer cars.

In April 2020, designs for standard gauge VLocity sets, to be used on the Albury line, were released by the Department of Transport, showing a standard 3-car layout with a buffet module in the centre trailer car.

Standard gauge sets VS93 and VS94 entered service on the Albury line on 30 December 2021.

As of June 2022, there were six 3-car standard gauge sets in service, numbered VS93-98. Albury services run as either 3- or 6-car sets depending on expected passenger numbers, with a spare 3-car set from a Melbourne service stabled at Albury until required for a 6-car return journey.

== Design ==
=== Technical ===
There are four car types in the VLocity class:

- The Driver Motor with Disabled Access cars, numbered 11xx & 21xx and designated DM(D), this is the No.1 or "East" facing end of every set and;
- The Driver Motor cars, numbered 12xx & 22xx and designated DM, this being the No.2 or West facing end with either;
- The standard Trailer Motor cars, numbered 13xx & 23xx and designated TM or;
- The Kiosk fitted Trailer Motor cars, numbered 15xx and designated TMC.

It is usual for the set of semi-permanently coupled cars to be described as zVLxx where z indicates the number of carriages in the fixed set as the original VLocity sets consisted of only the DM(D) & DM carriages making a 2 carriage set with the trailer units being added later to make the current 3 carriage sets. xx is the final two or 3 digits of the car designation – for example, the set 1150-1350-1250 would be described as 3VL50 while standard gauge sets use the VSxx format., the 2VL designation has not been used since May 2018 when the last remaining 2 carriage VLocity Set was converted to 3 carriages.

From the introduction of set 100 onward, the VL set designation continued as VL100 and so on. However, individual cars from 100 onward use 2xxx numbering rather than 1xxx. For example, set VL132 consists of cars 2132–2332–2232.

Power is provided by a Cummins QSK 19R diesel engine (559 kW (750 hp)) under each car, attached on a separate underframe. The engine powers both axles on one bogie in each car, while the other bogie is unpowered. The engine is supplemented by an 80 kW (110 hp) Cummins auxiliary power unit for lighting and air-conditioning purposes. The VLocity uses a Voith T312 hydraulic transmission system with dynamic braking capabilities.

According to Cummins, as a result of that propulsion system the VLocity is the most reliable diesel railcar in the world, with a Mean Distance Between Failures (MDBF) of 150,000 km (93,000 mi). V/Line reported a MDBF of 157,805 km (98,055 mi) in the 2016–17 financial year. (Note: A "failure" is defined under this standard as an event resulting in a five-minute service delay.)

The primary suspension system of the VLocity is composed of a traction rod, with two elastomer bushes, linking the axle box and bogie frame.

Among the design innovations in the VLocity units are the integration of the air-conditioning unit into the ceiling superstructure, and a structurally isolated crumple zone in the nose which can be entirely replaced with a new module following a crash.

VLocity units are equipped with Scharfenberg couplers, enabling them to operate with other VLocity units. They can be coupled to older Sprinter DMUs but cannot be electrically linked, so a driver is required in both the Sprinter and VLocity if they are coupled. VLocitys can be towed by a locomotive using a coupling adaptor.

VLocitys operate throughout the V/Line/VicTrack broad gauge passenger network and also on the Australian Rail Track Corporation (ARTC)-controlled standard gauge line to Albury (NSW). The bogies were manufactured by Bombardier's Derby Litchurch Lane Works, and are fully gauge-convertible.

The VLocity units have a design life of 35 years. and a permanently coupled 3-car unit has a mass of 171 tonnes.

=== Interior ===
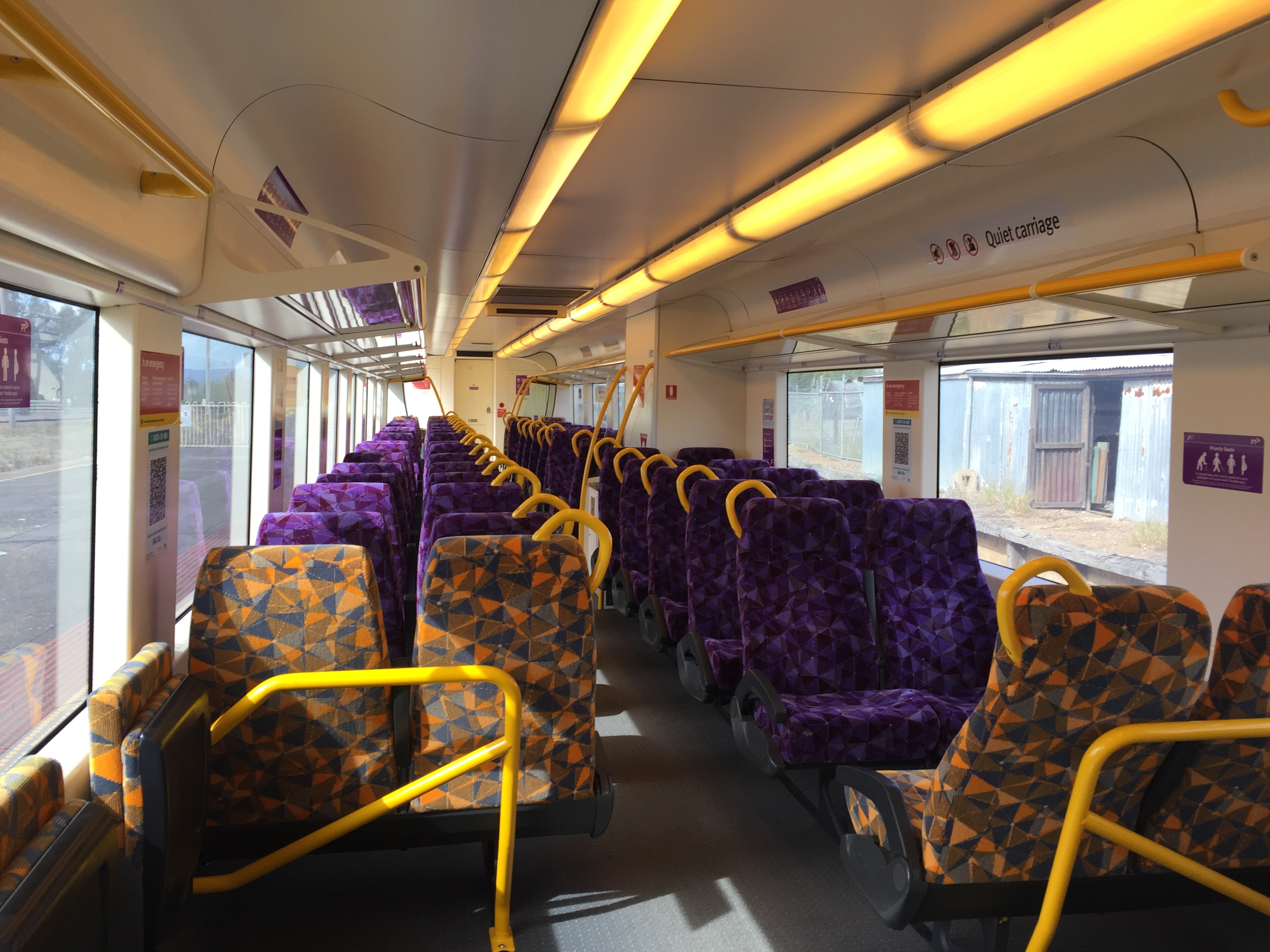
A refurbished car with purple upholstery (orange for priority seating), 2022

The driver's console for the VLocity is a dashboard mounted slightly below the one-piece windscreen of the train. There are two seats in the driving cabin with the active driver's seat positioned slightly to the left of the train's centre to suit the predominately left side mounting of trackside signalling in Australia. The second seat is slightly behind. The train is controlled by a combined throttle and brake lever, which has six power levels and the ability to vary the brake application. There is also an independent brake lever and a reverser handle in the driver's primary controls. When the trailer cars were added to the existing 2 carriage sets the driver cabs were retro fitted with the extra gauges to monitor the trailer unit driveline.

The seating layout for the VLocity is 2+2, with a mix of club-style seats facing each other, and aircraft-style rows. The seats cannot be rotated to face any particular direction, and seat backs do not recline. Four wheelchair spaces are provided in each set through the provision of tip-up seats. The VLocity offers economy-class seating only, although the seat width is equivalent to first class seating on V/Line locomotive-hauled services. In response to passenger feedback, the seatback angle in the intermediate carriages was made 2.5 degrees more upright than the original carriages. New deliveries from July 2010 onwards (3VL42 and above) featured a changed seatback angle and new seat fabrics.

Although VLocity carriages have tinted windows, they lack the curtains as fitted to earlier V/Line rolling stock. Passengers may move freely between the three semi-permanently coupled vehicles in a set, but not between the sets themselves. Conductors move between coupled sets at station stops.

Tables were installed in one unit (2VL28) for evaluation purposes, but were later removed. In three-car VLocity units, 32 seats in the intermediate carriage have fold-down tray tables, much like the first class seats on locomotive-hauled services.

There are overhead racks for small baggage, while larger baggage can be stored in designated baggage areas, with some spaces large enough for surfboards and bicycles. In January 2008, passengers were banned from taking bicycles on VLocity trains during peak hours, despite the designated bike area, with the ban repealed in February 2008.

The standard gauge long-distance sets have kiosk style catering.

The all-metal construction and metalised window tinting of the VLocity trains is an effective (measured at 25dB) blocker of all forms of radio communications into and out of the carriages including mobile phone signals preventing passengers from making reliable calls or utilising data devices.

To overcome this in an Australian first a joint venture between Telstra, V/Line, VicTrack, Alstom and CommScope to retrofit specially designed 3G/4G mobile phone repeater units into all existing VLocity sets in 2018 was created, this included the installation of repeater units in all new VLocity sets built after the joint venture commencement date.

The Node AM repeater is manufactured by CommScope and is designed to rebroadcast the main 3G & 4G 700, 850, 900 & 1800 MHz frequency spectrum utilised by the three mobile phone network providers, Telstra, Optus and TPG Telecom (Vodafone Australia) in Australia.

The program included state government funding for 35 additional mobile base stations to fix coverage black spots for the three networks that the internal repeaters could not overcome.

With the shutdown of all 3G networks in Australia now completed and the former 3G radio spectrum to be utilised for the newer 4G & 5G networks the Node AM repeaters have now been retuned to suit the 4G & 5G radio spectrum holdings of the Telstra, Optus & TPG (Vodafone) networks as at the end of 2025.

=== Livery ===
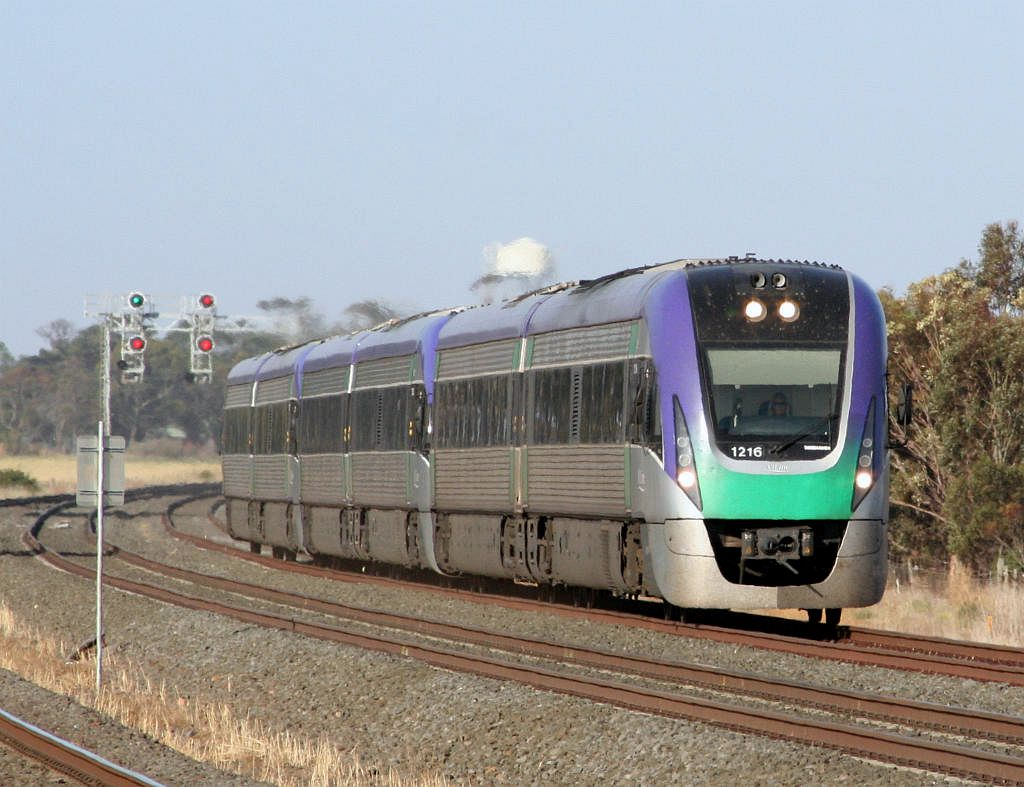
Three coupled 2-car VLocity sets in the original livery at Little River, November 2006

The original VLocity livery consisted of purple and green facings on a stainless steel car body. In March 2008, newly built VLocity set 3VL41 was outshopped with an altered cab livery, following recommendations in level crossing accident reports that trains be made more visible to motorists. Portions of reflective yellow were added to the cabs, along with more reflective silver directly beneath the cab windscreen. All units were retrospectively treated.

In June 2010, newly built set 3VL42 was released in a new livery of crimson stripe at roof level replacing the purple, and red replacing the green, a red stripe along the car body below the windows, white doors, and yellow front. The set also received high-intensity discharge (HID) headlights which project light for up to 1 kilometre (0.62 mi), modified windscreen wipers and cab windows.

In 2014, 3VL40 had a new Public Transport Victoria livery applied. All sets from 3VL52 were delivered in the purple livery, and it has been applied to earlier sets and has been nicknamed the "Polly Waffle" livery due to similarities to the colour scheme of the so-named chocolate bar wrapper.

== Reception and impact ==
The VLocity seating layout is 2+2 instead of the 2+3 seating provided in other V/Line saloon-type carriages. A single VLocity car seats around 70 passengers, compared to 89 in the previous generation Sprinter with its narrower 2+3 seats.

The Regional Fast Rail project for which the VLocitys were built was criticised at the time for cost blow-outs during construction. These included the cost of installing extra safety measures deemed necessary for 160 km/h operation, which were added to the project after the Waterfall rail accident in New South Wales.

By 2012, the VLocity trains and attendant decreases in travel time were regarded as major factors in the economic revival of towns along V/Line routes. The combined effect of the trains' comfort, speed and reliability was noted to have enabled the creation of new commuter belt locations outside of Melbourne, and the increases in train frequency which followed the introduction of the VLocity sets was said to have substantially improved the convenience of accessing Melbourne from the Bendigo, Ballarat and Geelong regions.

A 2014 report by the federal government's Department of Infrastructure and Regional Development found that the VLocity trains had contributed to the overall success of the Regional Fast Rail project in increasing the accessibility of rail services for regional Victoria. The case study concluded that the improved ride quality of the trains was a significant contributor to improved passenger perceptions of rail services, and that the increased service frequency made possible by the trains was ultimately more beneficial from an operational perspective than any real or perceived time savings.

In 2021, V/Line introduced VLocity services on the Albury line, replacing locomotive hauled services. To provide that service, V/Line designed a longer-distance VLocity variant. The move to VLocity operation generated criticism, specifically relating to the reduced comfort, overcrowding, and lack of on-train amenities. There have been regular reports on social media that the onboard catering has not been in operation due to a lack of staff, and criticism of the quality of the offerings from the snack bar substandard.

From 1 November 2024, V/Line introduced VLocity train sets on the Warrnambool line to replace all non overnight stabled locomotive hauled passenger services to Warrnambool, which has also been criticised. The complaints centred on the fact that V/Line did not provide trains purpose-designed for services to more distance regional cities. Other criticisms about VLocity trains relate to engine noise within the train itself, the quality of seats, and the lack of onboard catering on long-distance services.

== Accidents and incidents ==
On 28 April 2006, set 2VL29 was involved in a collision at a level crossing at Trawalla while travelling from Ararat. It collided with a large tri-axle road trailer carrying a 16-tonne block of stone and two heavy press machines. The front of the train withstood the impact with the trailer, but the press machines were thrown loose, striking and penetrating the cab. The incident caused two fatalities. At the time of the impact, three people were in the cab: the driver, who was seriously injured, and two off-duty Pacific National drivers, one of whom was killed and the other injured. As the train continued through the crossing, the rear trailer swung around and the stone block was thrown off, striking and partially penetrating the side of the leading car 1129, killing one passenger and injuring forty others. The unit had only been in service for seven days before the accident. After the accident, both cars were taken to Newport Workshops for examination. Carriage 1129 suffered the most damage and was written off and scrapped. Carriage 1229, having received relatively minor damage, was sent to Bombardier in Dandenong for repairs. It was later renumbered 1241 and marshalled together with new cars 1141 and 1341 with set 2VL29 struck off the register.

On 5 May 2006, set 2VL4, travelling on the 09:38 service from Southern Cross to Ararat, collided with a car at the protected Rockbank level crossing near Melton. Thirty train passengers and the driver of the car were taken to hospital.

On 26 February 2010, during a passenger service to Bendigo, the driver of sets 2VL6, 2VL5 and 2VL17, three two-car sets coupled together, was alerted to the smell of smoke in the leading car of 2VL5. The train stopped at Watergardens, where the driver, and a relief driver also on board the train, discovered a fire in the park brake system of 2VL5, which they were able to extinguish quickly. 2VL6 was decoupled and continued to Bendigo without incident. An investigation found that the park brake had either not been released on departure, or had been inadvertently activated by the relief driver who was travelling in the empty cab of the 2VL5 lead car.

On 22 August 2014, a Metro Trains Comeng train Train 6502 consisted of two, 3-car sets being of cars 338M (Leading) - 1092T - 484M and 487M - 1052T - 427M., which had departed Laverton en route to Flinders Street, stopped after the driver noticed a loud noise and an apparent fault in his train's braking system. The V/Line train 8280 was a VLocity Diesel Multiple Unit consisting of VL05 (units 1105 (leading) and 1205), VL12 (units 1112 and 1212) and VL39 (units 1139, 1339 and 1239), which was being transferred from Geelong to Southern Cross without passengers, passed a red automatic signal in a manner that did not conform to Section 3, Rule 1 of the 1994 Book of Rules and Operating Procedures, and the driver was unable to stop before VL5 (1105) collided with the rear (427M) of stationary Metro train. The driver of the VLocity and 8 passengers on the Metro train sustained minor injuries. An investigation by the Australian Transport Safety Bureau found that the driver of the VLocity was travelling too fast for the situation, was distracted and the inadequate rear marker lights on the Metro EMU contributed to the collision.

On 15 February 2017, set 3VL34 collided with a vehicle that had been abandoned on the line near Kangaroo Flat and derailed. Two people were injured.

On 30 May 2020, set 3VL70 failed to stop at Ballarat station due to a braking problem and smashed through the historic Lydiard Street interlocked level crossing swing gates at 93 km/h, stopping 600m past the station platform. The Lydiard Street level crossing was closed for a year. In May 2021, the Victorian government announced that the gates at the Lydiard Street level crossing gates would not be repaired, and would be replaced by boom barriers effectively removing the last remaining set of working wooden swing gates from the Victorian network. The level crossing re-opened to traffic on 16 November 2021.

On 14 July 2022, set 3VL35, on a scheduled Echuca - Southern Cross service, collided with a semi trailer at an unprotected level crossing near Goornong, 30 km north-east of Bendigo. None of the 40 passengers on the train were injured, but both the train and truck driver were taken to hospital. VL35 was repaired and returned to revenue service.

On 11 December 2023, set 3VL100, on a scheduled Geelong service, collided with a semi trailer that was blocking the Station Street level crossing in Norlane. None of the crew or 25 passengers on the train were injured, but the driver of the truck was killed.

On the afternoon of 30 November 2024, standard gauge set 3VS97 derailed at slow speed near Southern Cross No.1 Signal Box affecting all standard gauge services to Southern Cross, including the Sydney XPT service which terminated short at Broadmeadows, until it was rerailed later that evening. This was a positioning move so there were no passengers on board at the time.

At 10:10am on 11 February 2025, 3VL60, operating as a 6 car down Bairnsdale (8461) service with 3VL01, collided with a truck towing a Dog Trailer loaded with a Skid Steer at an uncontrolled farm driveway level crossing in Kilmany. The impact caused the trailer or Skid Steer to penetrate the side of DM(D) Carriage 1160 dislodging some passenger seats but no serious injuries reported.

== Operations ==
Technically, a maximum of four 3-car VLocity sets can be coupled together as a single train. Between 2008 and 2016, some 7-car VLocity trains operated on the Geelong line, made up of two 2-car sets and a 3-car set. However, following the conversion of the entire VLocity fleet to run as 3-car sets, almost all VLocity services have operated as three or six car trains. The exception is that, from 30 May 2022, due to heavy peak period patronage, some 9-car VLocity trains started operating between Wyndham Vale and Southern Cross during peak times.

VLocity trains are authorised to run in revenue service on the following lines:

- North East line from Melbourne to Seymour, Shepparton, and on standard gauge to Albury
- Gippsland line from Melbourne to Traralgon and Bairnsdale
- Bendigo line from Melbourne to Bendigo, and then to Eaglehawk on the Swan Hill line and Echuca on the Echuca line
- Warrnambool line from Melbourne to Waurn Ponds and Warrnambool
- Serviceton line to Ballarat and then to Ararat, and from Ballarat to Maryborough on the Mildura line.
- Non passenger services have run between Geelong and Ballarat during periods where the direct Melbourne-Ballarat line is closed due to works to allow access to the Ballarat Workshops for train servicing purposes.

VLocity trains are permitted to run up to 160 km/h (99 mph) only on lines where all level crossings are protected by boom gates and lights and track upgrades have been completed. However, services to Echuca (past Epsom) and Ararat (past Wendouree) run on lines that do not meet these standards, and as a result, cannot reach their full speed. The Echuca line has been upgraded to allow 130 km/h (81 mph) operation. In 2017, the State Government announced upgrade works to extend VLocity services to Warrnambool, Albury and Bairnsdale, and in 2019 announced upgrades to allow them to run to Shepparton.

A VLocity simulator is used by V/Line for driver training. The simulator replicates the driving cabin of the VLocity and includes forward vision and rear mirror graphics and audio effects. An instructor positioned outside the simulator can control track conditions and replicate some faults with the train itself.

Standard gauge VLocity services on the Albury line began on 30 December 2021, while VLocity services to Shepparton began revenue services from 31 October 2022. VLocity services to Warrnambool began from 1 November 2024 with all Warrnambool services using VLocity sets since early April 2025 now that the upgraded stabling facilities at Warrnambool have been completed.
