= Tocumwal railway line, Victoria =

Railway line in Victoria, Australia

Tocumwal

Overview
- Status: Operational; freight-only beyond Shepparton
- Owner: VicTrack
- Locale: Victoria, Australia
- Termini: Tocumwal; Southern Cross

Service
- Services: Craigieburn; Seymour; Shepparton; Upfield
- Operators: Passenger: Metro Trains, V/Line; Freight: Pacific National
- Depot: Southern Cross

History
- Opened: 1860

Technical
- Line length: 251.4 km (156.2 mi)
- Num of tracks: 1 (between Tocumwal and Seymour); 2 (between Seymour and Southern Cross)
- Track gauge: 1,600 mm (5 ft 3 in)
- Electrification: 1500 V DC overhead between Craigieburn and Southern Cross
- Signalling: Automatic block from Southern Cross to Craigieburn; Double line block to Seymour; Train order to Tocumwal

The Tocumwal railway line is a 1,600 mm (5 ft 3 in) gauge railway line in Victoria, Australia. The line runs between the border town of Tocumwal in New South Wales to Southern Cross station in Melbourne. The line is used by various passenger and freight trains serving the northern suburbs of Melbourne and northern regions of Victoria.

== History ==
The Melbourne and Essendon Railway Company opened the first section of the Tocumwal railway line from North Melbourne to Essendon in 1860. Following its take over by the Victorian Government in 1867, the line was extended to Tallarook and Mangalore in 1872.

A line was built from Mangalore to Toolamba and Shepparton in 1880 and extended to Numurkah in 1881, Strathmerton in 1905 and connecting with the New South Wales Government Railways at Tocumwal at a break-of-gauge in 1908.

Passenger services to Tocumwal ended on 8 November 1975 with the last train operated by T class diesel locomotive T324 and passenger carriages 3AS – 31BE – 2AE – 22CE. Before this time the Strathmerton – Cobram section was operated as the 'branch line' with a 102hp Walker railmotor connecting with the main line train. A bus service was then introduced for the Tocumwal branch, connecting with the Cobram service. By 1977/78 the service between Cobram and Tocumwal was being operated by a VicRail owned station wagon driven by the Cobram station master.

The last passenger service from Toolamba station to Echuca ran on 2 March 1981 with Y class diesel locomotive Y161, an ABE carriage and a C van. This consist had only been introduced a few months prior, with a DERM usually being rostered. Toolamba finally closed as a station on 20 December 1987.

The passenger service from Numurkah north to Cobram was withdrawn on 24 April 1981 but was restored on 14 August 1983. The service was cut back to Shepparton on 21 August 1993, with Hoys Roadlines taking control of the train from 22 August, hiring locomotives, carriages and train crews from V/Line. This arrangement remained until 2004.

There have been calls for the line to be standardised as part of the proposed Melbourne to Brisbane 'Inland Railway'. In April 2008 it was announced that the Shepparton – Tocumwal section of the line would also be upgraded, as part of the Victorian core grain network in a A$23.7 million package with 6 other lines.

On 20 February 2020, a NSW TrainLink XPT passenger train on the adjacent North East railway line towards Sydney derailed at Wallan, resulting in suspension of freight, V/Line and NSW TrainLink services on the North East and Tocumwal railway lines. V/Line services resumed on 1 and 2 March 2020.

As part of Regional Rail Revival, Donnybrook station and Wallan station received upgrades, include new platform shelters and extensions of the city-bound platforms. The upgrades were completed in August 2020.

On 31 October 2022, after a week long delay due to extensive major flooding in the Goulburn Valley region, VLocity trains started running from Seymour-Shepparton for the first time, replacing the previous N and H set locomotive hauled services. The N set included a buffet and first-class seating, this is no longer available as the VLocity trains does not have catering facilities and first class seating on board.

=== Branch lines ===
Current freight train operations are as-required grain trains operated by Pacific National and Southern Shorthaul Railroad. In addition to these, Pacific National also operates a thrice weekly container service from Tocumwal to Appleton Dock.

==== South of Craigieburn ====
In October 1889, the Upfield railway line was extended to Somerton, but closed in July 1903. In March 1928, despite strong resistance from the Railways Commissioners, the state government ordered the reopening of the section from Fawkner to near Somerton for passengers, although no actual connection was provided at this time. In May 1956, the line from Fawkner to Somerton was again closed, but only three years later, in July 1959, the Upfield to Somerton section reopened for goods trains. In January 1963, the line from Somerton to the Ford factory was re-laid as dual gauge gauntlet track, a year after the North East standard gauge line through Somerton opened.

A branch line was opened during the Second World War to Broadstore, designed to connect Broadmeadows station with the Maygar Barracks. The line opened on 12 October 1942 and remaining in operation until 1982, when usage of the base began to.

==== Between Craigieburn and Seymour ====
A branch line opened from Heathcote Junction (near Kilmore) to Kilmore in 1888 and to Tooborac in 1890, connecting with a line from Bendigo to Heathcote opened a little earlier. The Heathcote Junction – Heathcote line closed in 1968. A branch line from Kilmore to Lancefield opened in 1892, closed in 1904.

The Mansfield line opened from Tallarook to Yea in 1883, Molesworth in 1889, Cathkin and Merton in 1890 and Mansfield in 1891. It is now closed. A branch line was built from Cathkin to Koriella in 1890 and Alexandra in 1909. This line closed in 1978.

==== North of Seymour ====
A branch line was subsequently built from Murchison East to Rushworth and Colbinabbin, with another branch from Rushworth to Stanhope and Girgarre. A cross-country line between Toolamba and Echuca was completed in 1887.

A short branch line was opened from Shepparton to Dookie in 1888. A tramway, built and operated by the Shire of Tungamah, was opened between Dookie and Katamatite in 1890. It was taken over by the Victorian Railways in 1896. Another short branch line was opened from Strathmerton to Cobram in 1888.

== Passenger services ==
Suburban electrified services to Craigieburn in Melbourne's north-west are operated by Metro Trains Melbourne as the Craigieburn line. Upfield line services use a small section of the line between North Melbourne and Southern Cross.

V/Line operates the Seymour V/Line rail service to Seymour, with five return services each weekday, and three on weekends, extending to Shepparton. These services run express through most metropolitan stations. Beyond Shepparton, the line is only used for freight.
