= Shepparton railway station =

Railway station in Victoria, Australia

Shepparton
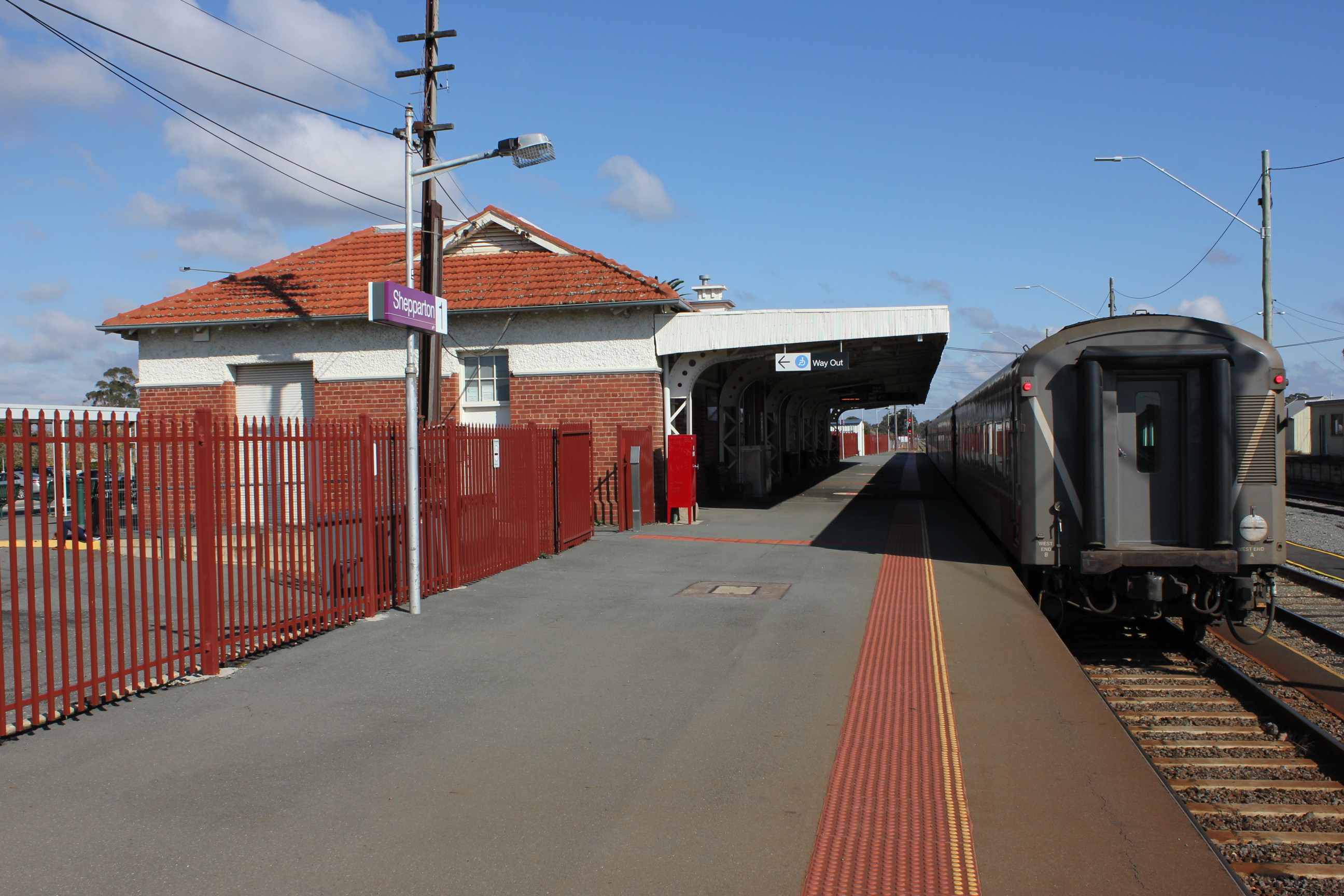
- Southbound view from the station platform, May 2017

General information
- Location: Purcell Street, Shepparton, Victoria 3630; City of Greater Shepparton; Australia
- Coordinates: 36°23′02″S 145°24′22″E
- System: PTV regional rail station
- Owner: VicTrack
- Operator: V/Line
- Line: Shepparton (Tocumwal)
- Distance: 181.85 kilometres from Southern Cross
- Platforms: 1
- Tracks: 5
- Connections: Bus

Construction
- Structure type: Ground
- Parking: Yes
- Accessible: Yes

Other information
- Status: Operational, staffed
- Station code: SHP
- Fare zone: Myki zone 13
- Website: Public Transport Victoria

History
- Opened: 13 January 1880; 146 years ago

Services
Preceding station	V/Line	Following station
Mooroopna towards Southern Cross	Shepparton line	Terminus
Former services
Preceding station	Disused railways	Following station
Mooroopna	Tocumwal line	Congupna
Junction	Dookie line	Pine Lodge
Location
- Location within Victoria

Shepparton railway station is a regional railway station on the Tocumal line and is the terminus for the Shepparton line. The station is part of the Victoria rail network. It serves the city of Shepparton, in Victoria, Australia. Shepparton is a ground-level staffed station, featuring one side platform. The station opened on 13 January 1880.

It is the terminus for V/Line services from Melbourne. A 725 metre long crossing loop is located opposite the station.

== History ==
The station opened as a temporary terminus of the line from Mangalore, on the main North East line. The line was extended north to Numurkah in 1881, and a branch line to Dookie opened in 1888.

A number of goods sidings are located between the station and crossing loop, which is used to stable the container freight service to Tocumwal, and for shunting the now defunct oil train. Further sidings are located to the south, the first serving disused British Imperial Oil Company, Vacuum Oil Coy and C.O.R. Oil Coy depots. To the north were sidings for livestock, and a second oil terminal, which was in use until 2008, when oil services were discontinued by Pacific National. The department siding (pear packing siding) was abolished in April 1979, with the former weighbridge siding removed in July 1988, with the weighbridge itself and points leading to the siding removed not long after.

Boom barriers were provided at the High Street level crossing, located nearby in the down direction of the station, in 1973.

The V/Line Freightgate centre opened at Shepparton in April 1985. Costing $100,000, it was officially opened by V/Line chairman, Mr. Keith Fitzmaurice. The centre covered 2,000 cubic metres, and could have handled 500 pallets each week. During this time, the passenger facilities in the main station building were also refurbished.

The V/Line passenger service once continued further north to Cobram, until these services were withdrawn on 21 August 1993.

== Platforms and services ==
Shepparton has one platform. It is serviced by V/Line Shepparton line services.

Shepparton platform arrangement
Platform	Line	Destination
1	Shepparton line	Southern Cross

== Transport links ==
Dysons operates one route via Shepparton station, under contract to Public Transport Victoria:

- 5 : Shepparton – Archer
