= Great Victorian Rail Trail =

Rail trail in Victoria, Australia

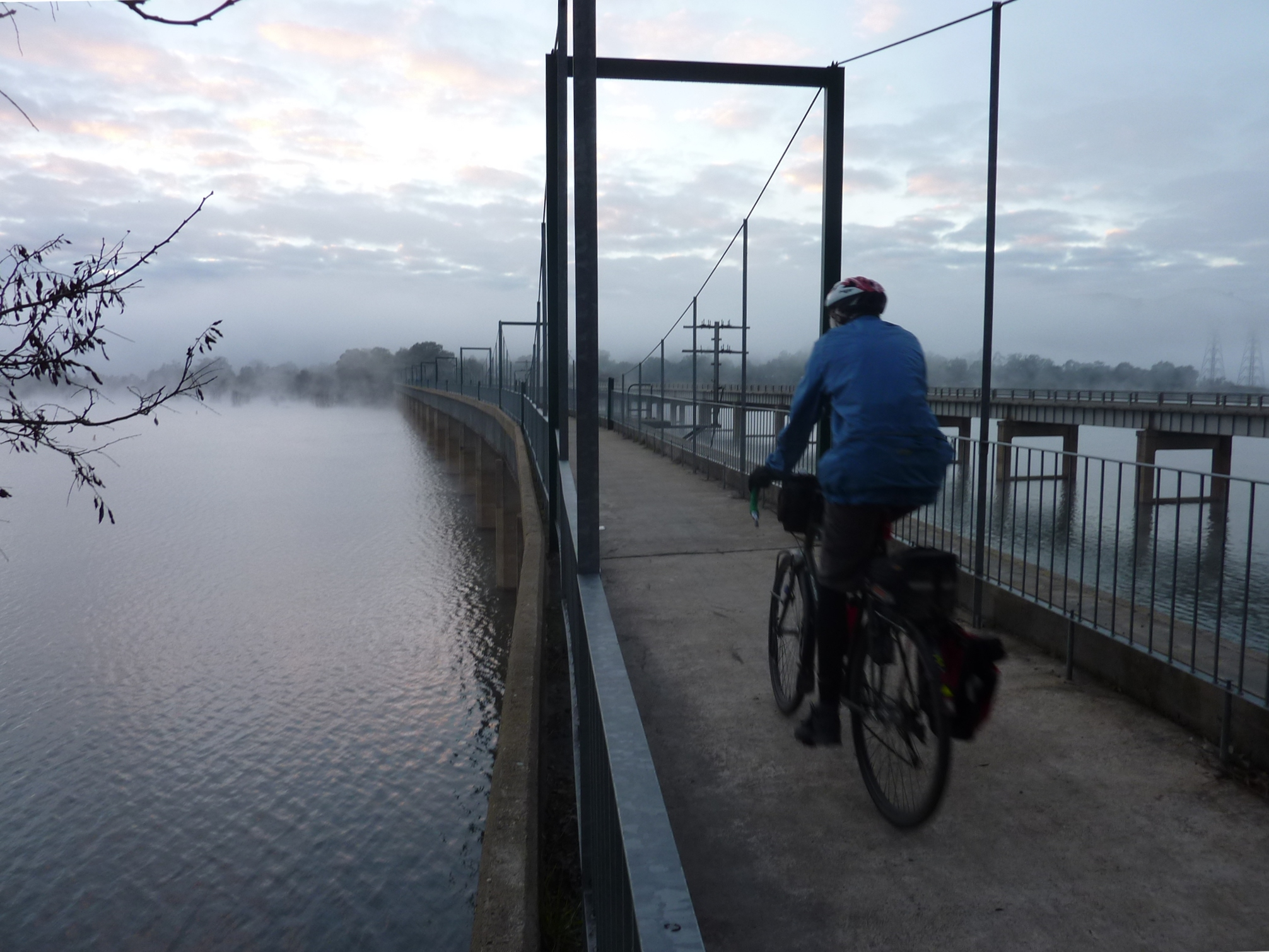
- The GVRT crossing Lake Eildon, near Bonnie Doon.
- Length: 134 km
- Location: Victoria, Australia
- Established: June 2012; 14 years ago
- Difficulty: Low
- Surface: Gravel
- Hills: Gentle (except Alexandra branch)
- Water: Available in towns
- Train: Regular services to Seymour Station near start of route
- Bus: Available in major towns

Trail map
- Great Victorian Rail Trail Map

The Great Victorian Rail Trail (previously the Goulburn River High Country Rail Trail), is in north-central Victoria, Australia, about 100 kilometres (62 mi) north-east of Melbourne, and is the second-longest rail trail in Australia, after the 161 km Brisbane Valley Rail Trail in Queensland. It follows the route of the former Mansfield railway line and its branch line to Alexandra. The trail surface is partially granitic sand and partly chert (a kind of gravel).

Officially opened in June 2012, the trail runs for 134 km (83 mi) from Tallarook, near Seymour, through Trawool, Yea and Bonnie Doon to Mansfield, with an offshoot from Cathkin to Alexandra. Highlights include the 200-metre (220 yd) Cheviot Tunnel near Yea, views of the Goulburn River, the heritage-listed Trawool Valley, and the former rail bridge over Lake Eildon near Bonnie Doon.

The towns passed through by the main rail trail are: Tallarook, Trawool, Kerrisdale, Homewood, Yea, Victoria, Molesworth, Yarck, Kanumbra, Merton, Bonnie Doon, Maindample, and Mansfield. The trail forks near Molesworth, with a short branch leading to Alexandra.

== History ==
On 29 April 2009, the federal government announced that it would contribute A$13.2 million from its community infrastructure program, out of the estimated total cost of A$14.2 million needed for the completion of the trail, as an economic stimulus, and as part of the recovery effort in the wake of the 2009 Victorian bushfires. The money was used to build and repair bridges, and construct road crossings, car parking, rest stops and amenities.

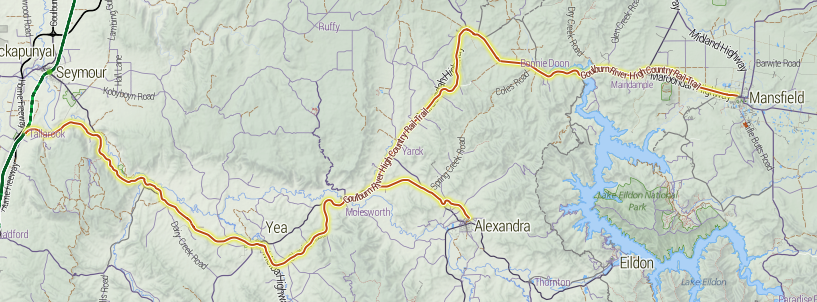
Map of the Goulburn River High Country Rail Trail.
