= Yea, Victoria =

Yea
- Town
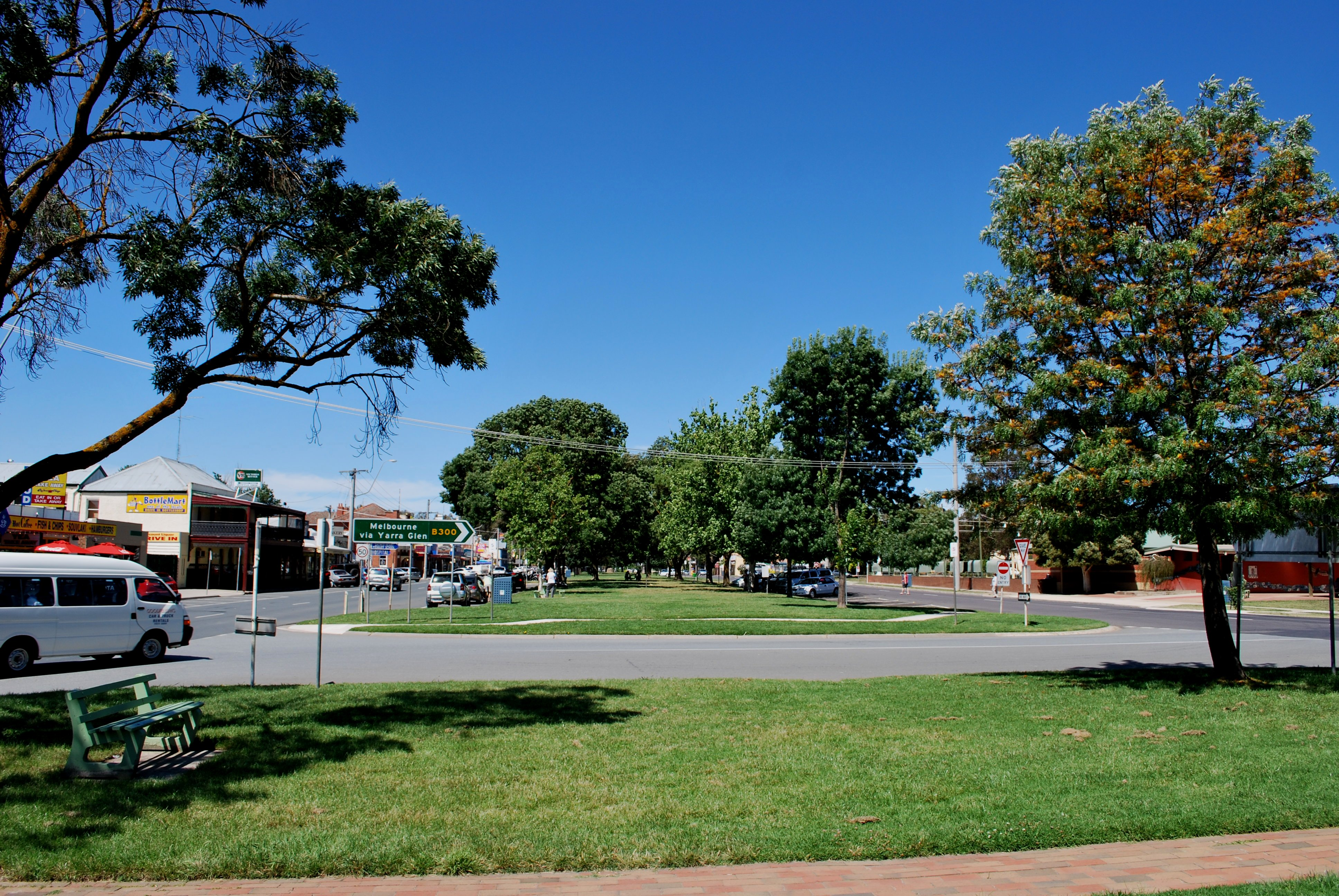
- High Street, Yea

- Interactive map of Yea
- Coordinates: 37°12′45″S 145°25′26″E
- Country: Australia
- State: Victoria
- Region: Hume
- LGA: Shire of Murrindindi
- First People: Taungurung
- Location: 112 km (70 mi) NE of Melbourne; 38 km (24 mi) SE of Seymour; 34 km (21 mi) W of Alexandra
- Established: 1855

Government
  - State electorate: Eildon
  - Federal division: Indi

Area
  - Total: 177.3 km^{2} (68.5 sq mi)
- Elevation: 172 m (564 ft)

Population
  - Total: 1,789 (2021 census)
  - Density: 10.090/km^{2} (26.134/sq mi)
- Time zone: UTC+10 (AEST)
  - Summer (DST): UTC+11 (AEDT)
- Postcode: 3717
- County: Anglesey
- Mean max temp: 20.6 °C (69.1 °F)
- Mean min temp: 6.6 °C (43.9 °F)
- Annual rainfall: 638.9 mm (25.15 in)
Localities around Yea
Ghin Ghin	Killingworth	Molesworth
Homewood	Yea	Limestone
Flowerdale	Glenburn	Murrindindi

Yea (/ˈjeɪ/ YAY) is a town in Victoria, Australia 112 kilometres (70 mi) north-east of the state capital Melbourne at the junction of the Goulburn Valley Highway and the Melba Highway, in the Shire of Murrindindi local government area. In an area originally inhabited by the Taungurung people, it was first visited by Europeans of the Hume and Hovell expedition in 1824, and within 15 years most of the land in the area had been taken up by graziers. Surveyed in 1855, the township grew as a service centre for grazing, gold-mining and timber-getting in the area.

The town has had a fairly stable population (around 1,100) since 1900, though it now has a relatively old population. The town economy is based around servicing the farming sector, and tourism, with good road links but little public transport. The town has education supplied by three schools (state primary and high schools, and a Catholic primary). It has three churches, and active sporting clubs.

Heritage sites around the town include the railway station buildings, Purcell's General Store and the nearby Yea Flora Fossil Site, where the most ancient leafy foliage so far found on earth was discovered.

== History ==
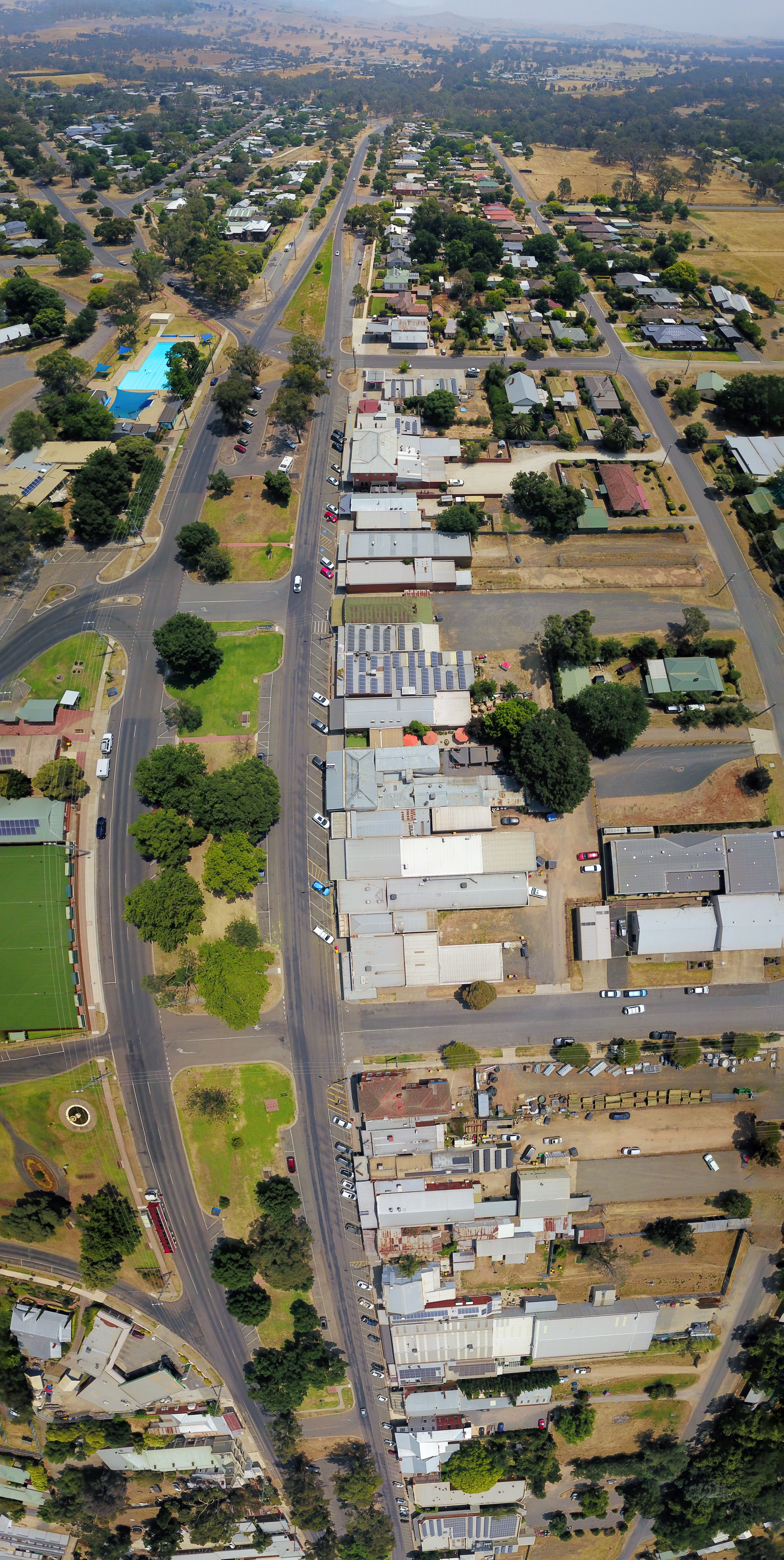
High Street, Yea. Jan 2020

The area was historically inhabited by the Taungurung people. They knew the Yea River as Caluther, and the Goulburn River as Warring. Shortly after the time of white settlement their numbers in the area were estimated at 500-600, but before this their numbers had already declined severely due to disease, and the destruction of their traditional hunting grounds by introduced stock and other European encroachment saw their numbers rapidly decrease. The first Europeans in the area were a party of explorers led by William Hovell and Hamilton Hume, who crossed the Goulburn River at a point near Molesworth in December 1824, and crossed the stream they named Muddy Creek the following day. (The Muddy Creek was renamed the Yea River in 1879.) They reported the area as very suitable for grazing, though in the hills good soil was only to be found in the hollows, but they found the forest almost impenetrable as they left the area south-west towards King Parrot Creek.

=== European settlement ===
The first European settlers in the district were overlanders from New South Wales, who arrived in 1837, and by 1839 "most of the suitable country in the area had been taken up". The crossing of the Muddy Creek became quite busy as part of the route from Melbourne to the goldfields at Beechworth and the eastern highlands, and also from them to Ballarat. After a blacksmith set up a forge and dwelling at the crossing, and a complaint from the local landholder, a town was surveyed and laid out in 1855 by T.W.Pinniger. Apparently under instruction from the State Surveyor-General Andrew Clarke, it was named after Colonel Lacy Walter Giles Yea – a British Army colonel killed in June of that year at the Battle of the Great Redan in the Crimean War, and who had been Clarke's commanding officer in England in 1830s. Town lots went on sale at Kilmore the following year. There was at least one store open by 1856, and the Post Office opened in 1858.

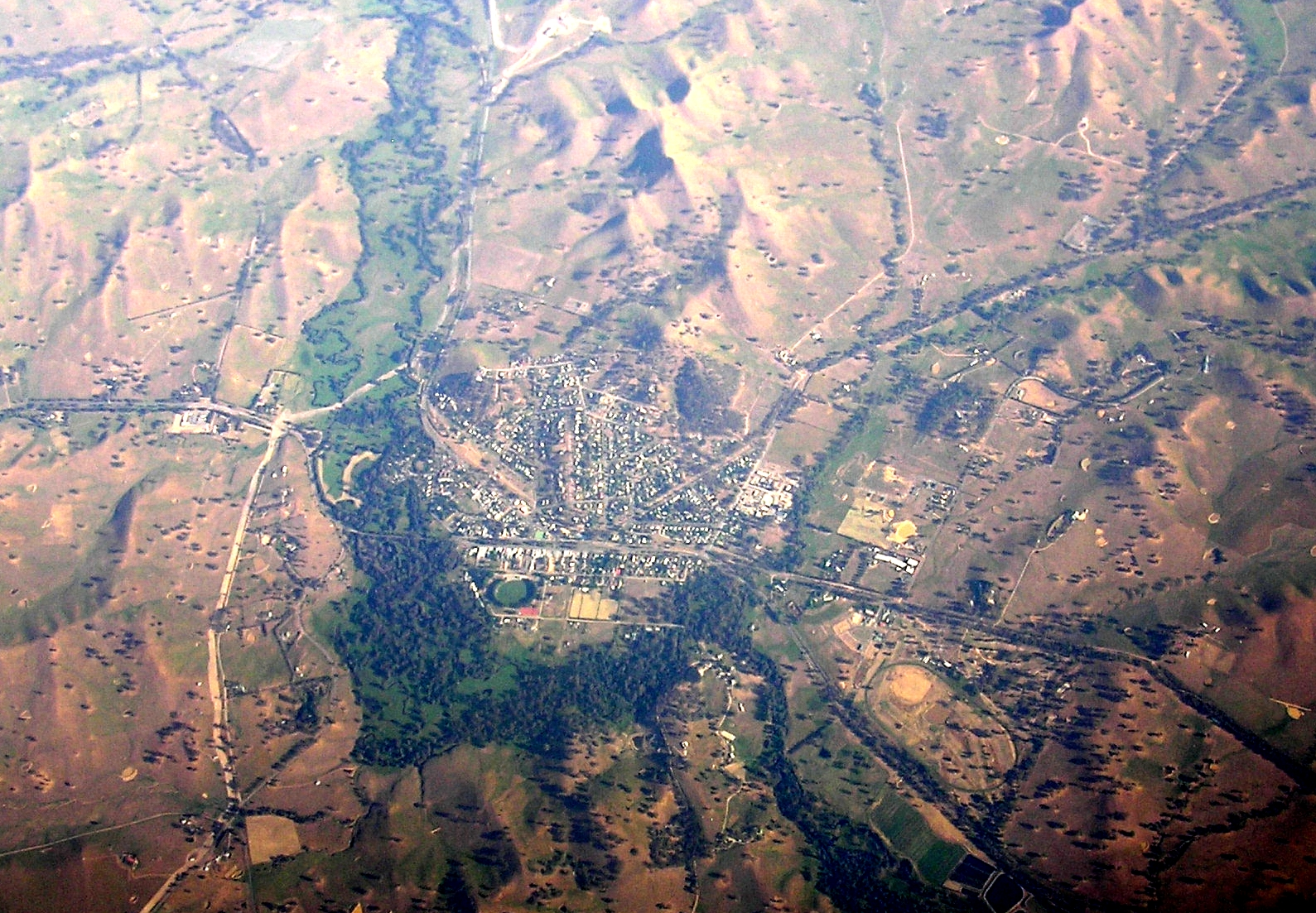
Aerial photo of Yea

=== Development ===
Yea expanded under the influx of hopeful prospectors, both as a natural overnight stopping place on the route from Melbourne to other goldfields, but especially when gold was discovered in the local area in the late 1850s. The gold-mining localities near Yea included the 'Providence' diggings just across the Yea River from the town, in the Ghin Ghin area, the Ti Tree Creek, and the 'Higinbotham' area on the Murrindindi Creek. None except the Providence and Ti Tree Creek yielded profitable gold on any commercial scale for more than about 5 years, the Providence was effectively closed by 1889 and the Welcome mine on Ti Tree Creek by the mid 1890s.

After the gold mining ended the town survived on servicing farming and timber getting (chiefly from the Murrindindi forests). The sawmilling industry saw a high production period from 1907 to 1915, at the end of which the Great War saw many men enlist, and then another boom from 1923 to 1930, after which the onset of the Great Depression saw production greatly reduce as demand fell. In these times of highest production, there was in excess of 2,500,000 board feet (5,900 m^{3}) of timber sent out each year over the tramlines to Cheviot.

The Yea Dairy Company was formed in 1891. Creameries around the district substantially increased the income of local farmers, and considerable amounts of butter were shipped to Melbourne.

A major threat to the township was the Trawool Water Scheme (announced for implementation in 1908), which would have almost certainly meant the drowning of the town. Property values became depressed, and two deputations to the state minister did not appear to change his mind. Survey work commenced, but the scheme was abandoned before it was completed, in favour of the site at Eildon.

=== Fires and floods ===
Bushfires and floods have influenced the Yea area quite frequently, fire having been recorded by the Hume and Hovell expedition, and floods affecting the roadways on a regular basis. In 1884 the area was affected by both flood and fire, on 1 January 1900 the Commonwealth Day celebrations were abandoned in order to fight a fire that surrounded the town, and in 1969 it had to be 'defended on all sides' from fire. In January 2026, an evacuation order was given for the town due to the Longwood bushfire; the fires did not reach the township itself, but nearby communities were heavily impacted.

== Geography ==
Yea

Climate chart (precipitation, max. and min. temperature)
J	F	M	A	M	J	J	A	S	O	N	D
11 29 11	39 29 12	42 26 9	49 21 6	57 16 4	60 12 3	60 12 3	65 14 3	63 17 4	61 20 6	54 24 8	47 27 10
- █ Average max. and min. temperatures in °C
- █ Precipitation totals in mm
- Source: Bureau of Meteorology
Imperial conversion
J	F	M	A	M	J	J	A	S	O	N	D
0.4 85 52	1.5 85 53	1.7 79 49	1.9 69 43	2.2 60 40	2.4 54 37	2.3 53 37	2.5 57 37	2.5 63 40	2.4 69 43	2.1 75 46	1.8 81 50
- █ Average max. and min. temperatures in °F
- █ Precipitation totals in inches

Yea is located on the inside (west and south) of a bend in the Yea River about 5 kilometres (3.1 mi) south-east of where it meets the Goulburn River. It is 112 kilometres (70 mi) north-east of Melbourne at 172 metres (564 ft) above sea-level, on the northern slopes of the Great Dividing Range. The centre of the town is on the flood plain of the Yea River, but the residential area to the south extends onto the slopes of the nearby hills. The Goulburn Valley Highway (B340) passes through the town, and the Melba Highway (B300) from Melbourne's eastern suburbs ends there. The other direct route to Melbourne is via the Yea-Whittlesea road (C725).

Yea's built environment consists of commercial, retail and public buildings along the Goulburn and Melba Highways as they run through the town, with residential areas largely to the south of the commercial centre, though newer residential estates have been developed to the west. The residential areas consist almost entirely of low-density, single-storey detached houses on their own blocks.

The surrounding area consists largely of pastoral properties running beef cattle and sheep.

=== Flora and fauna ===
No intact examples of native vegetation survive in the area immediately around Yea. That vegetation consisted of grassy woodlands dominated by river red gum (Eucalyptus camaldulensis) on the creeklines and nearby plains, grading to grassy forest dominated by Acacia and box Eucalyptus species in the nearby valleys and hills.

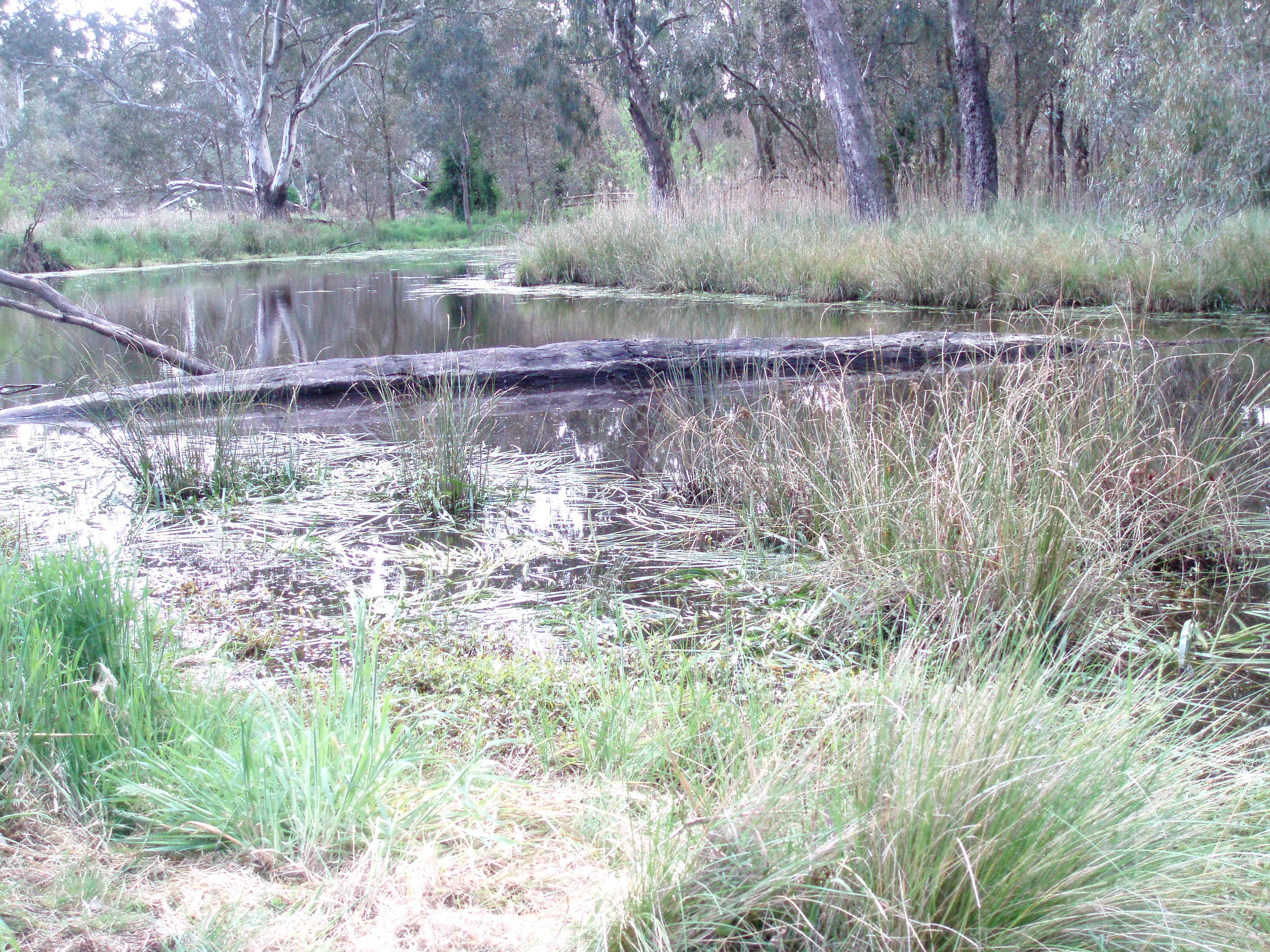
Yea Wetlands

The Yea Wetlands, an area of 32 hectares (79 acres) immediately to the east of the town, and situated between two branches of the Yea River, has had extensive work done to restore its native vegetation. This site is one of only six known locations of the ancient greenling damselfly (Hemiphlebia mirabilis), although no specimens have been recorded there since 2001.

== Governance ==
The first local governance in the area was the Yea District Road Board, formed in 1869, which became the Shire of Yea in 1873. Although subject to (sometimes severe) financial constraints at various times, and the substantial costs involved in maintaining the local road infrastructure in the face of fires and floods, the shire managed to develop some substantial public facilities, and to successfully lobby for improved transport and communication links to the area.

As part of the general re-arrangement of local government in Victoria, the Shire of Yea was incorporated into the Shire of Murrindindi in 1994. The town of Yea is in the Cheviot Ward of the shire.

== Law Courts ==
A Court of Petty Sessions was appointed in Yea in 1860, which continued (or as a Magistrates Court) until all courts in Yea were closed on 1 January 1990. The courts also operated as a County Court (1878-1915), a Licencing Court (1886-1917) and a Childrens Court (1907-1989).

== Demography ==
Yea, population and number of dwellings since 1900

Yea, population age profile in 2021

Source: Australian Bureau of Statistics

At the 2021 census, the town of Yea had a population of 1,789. Census records show the population of Yea has remained relatively stable since the beginning of the 20th century, except for a dip in the post second-world-war period. The number of dwellings has doubled over the same period. The higher than average proportion of older people in the town was recognised at least as early as 1991. Only half of the population over 15 years old is in the labour force.

== Economy ==
Yea has been a town servicing the agricultural and resources industries of the surrounding area since its inception. These included pastoral agriculture for the entire period, gold mining before 1900, and timber cutting and dairying from then until the late 20th century. The Yea Dairy Factory opened in 1891, and closed in 1993, but other industrial or manufacturing activities have never reached significant scale. The Yea Saleyards has become a significant livestock selling centre for Central Victoria, with sales occurring monthly.

The retail area of Yea still services the farming activities of the area, but over half of the shops now involve food service.

== Transport ==
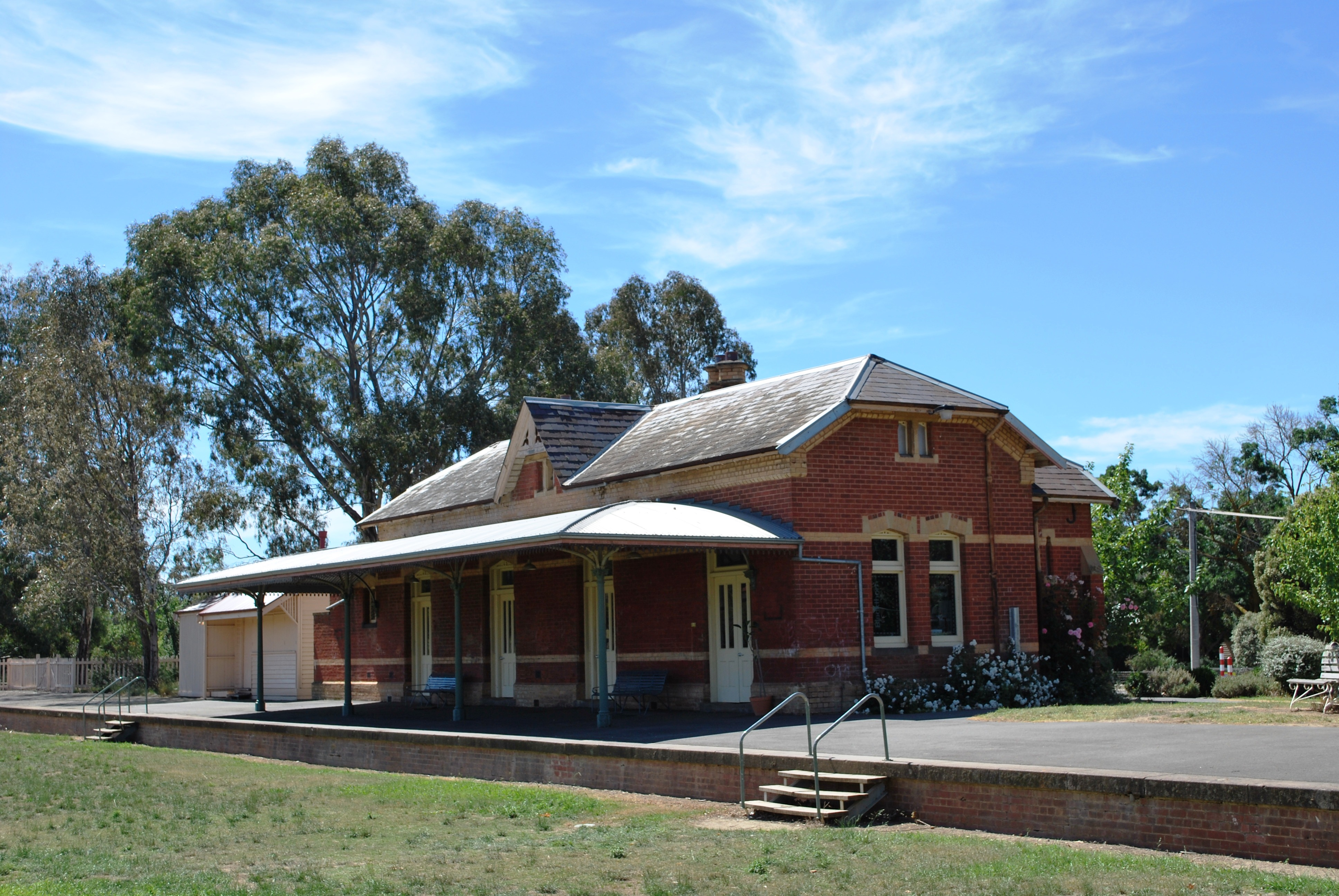
Platform at the former Yea railway station

The Yea District Road Board and its successor the Shire of Yea achieved substantial improvements in transport infrastructure in the area, including the bridges at Molesworth (1874) and King Parrot Creek (1872), and the successful lobbying for the rail line from Tallarook (opened 1883).

The railway was extended to Molesworth in 1889, chiefly for timber transport to Melbourne. The last passenger service ran on 28 May 1977, with the line closed on 18 November 1978. The railway line from Tallarook to Mansfield has now been converted to the Great Victorian Rail Trail.

Public transport services to and from Yea are limited to a V/Line coach service from Melbourne or Mansfield, and a V/Line coach service from Alexandra or Seymour via Yea. The closest railway station is Seymour railway station on the Seymour line.

== Religion ==
Although private religious worship occurred beforehand, the first public services were probably held in the 1850s. In 1857 the Muddy Creek Mission was formed, and it arranged for the services of an Anglican lay preacher, though the building they provided "should be used for the propagation of Evangelical Christianity without respect to the minor differences existing among the Protestant Evangelical Churches." A church (intended by its builder to be a Baptist church) was taken over by the Presbyterian Church in the mid 1860s, with the present Presbyterian church opened in 1923.

St Luke's Anglican church was opened in 1868, and the Catholic Sacred Heart Church in 1902.

== Education ==
The town's high school is Yea High School. The school is also the site of the Access Yea Community Education (AYCE) Flexible Learning Program, which is designed to help students who have left or are about to disengage from their learning.

Yea Primary School and the Catholic Sacred Heart Parish Primary School provide education for primary school age students.

== Sport ==
The earliest available record of a cricket match in Yea is for January 1869, against a Murrundindi side, though formal creation of a club did not occur until 1872.

An early record of a lawn tennis match between teams from Yea and Alexandra - one which 'created a large amount of interest in consequence of its being the first occasion that the local club has pitted its members against those belonging to a distant club' - occurred on the Queen's Birthday holiday in June 1891, though a petition (submitted in the same year) to formally reserve land for tennis stated that it 'has been used for years by the Tennis Club'.

Although signs at the entrances to the town state that Yea is the birthplace of olympic equestrian Bill Roycroft, he was actually born in Melbourne and grew up in Flowerdale.

The Yea Football Netball Club administers the two sports in the town, seniors playing in the Yarra Valley Mountain District Football and Netball League, and juniors in the Seymour District Junior Football Netball League. The senior netball teams have met with recent success. Due to the relative isolation of the town, the Tigers have competed in a number of different leagues, including the Kyabram & District Football League and the now defunct Central Goulburn Football League.

The Yea Racing Club schedules four race meetings a year.

Golfers play at the course of the Yea Golf Club on Racecourse Road.

== Landmarks and heritage sites ==
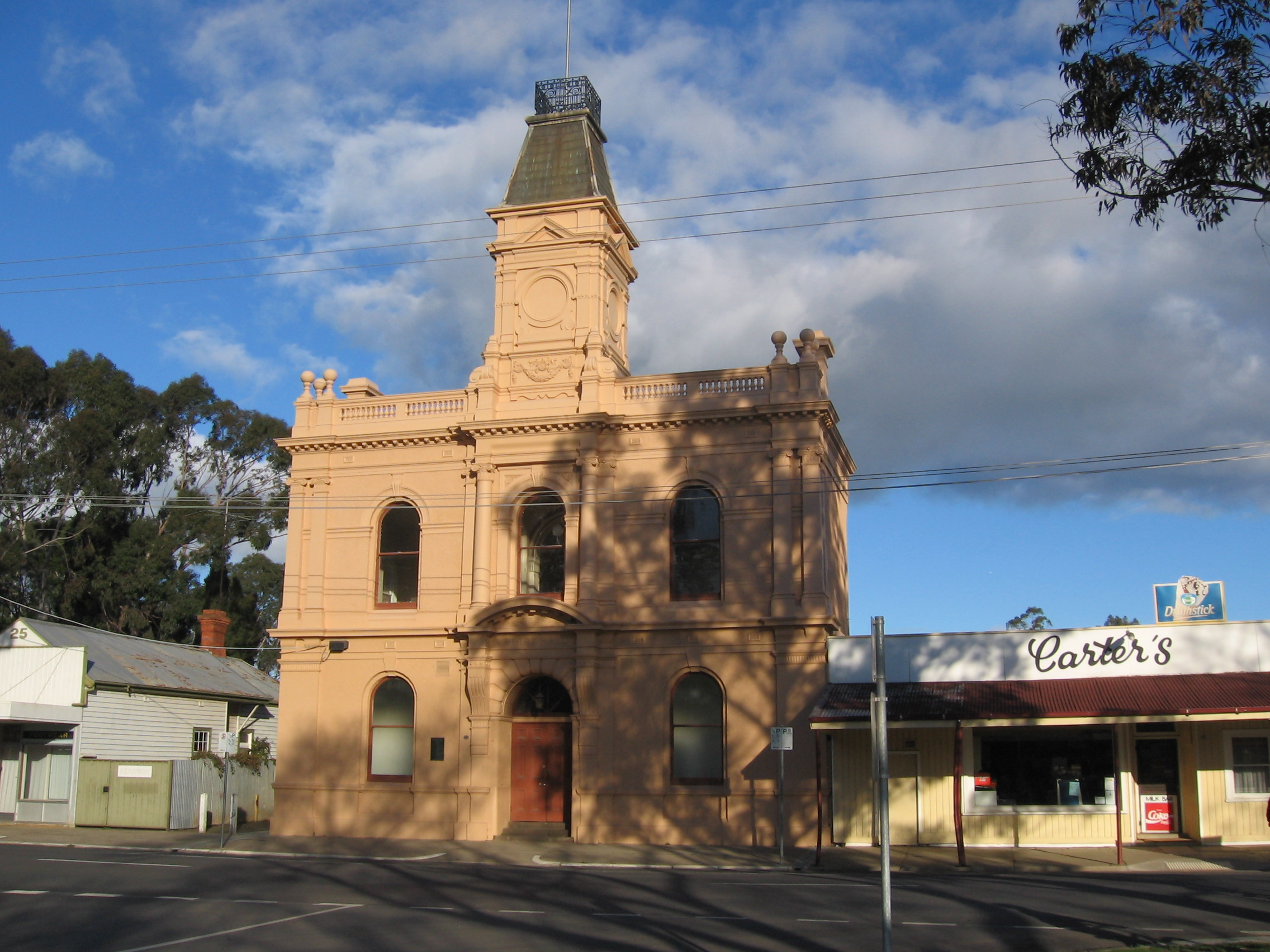
Yea Shire Hall, originally built in 1877, and the facade being a later addition.

Yea has a number of buildings on the Victorian Heritage Register.

The former Yea railway station "is the most intact example of a small group of standard Gothic-styled Railway Station buildings." Built in 1889, it is now managed by a Committee of Management and used for community events, including the monthly Yea Country Market.

The former Purcells General Store "is one of the oldest buildings still intact in Yea and was owned and operated by several generations of the Purcell family until 1986." The family operated a store in the town from the 1860s until 1986.

Other historic buildings include the former Yea & Mansfield Dairy Co Ltd building (1891) in Rattray St, the Yea Shire Hall (1877), the RSL Hall, and the Yea Memorial Hospital (1945).

The Yea Flora Fossil Site in Limestone Road is on the Australian National Heritage List due to the discovery of the oldest fossil evidence of vascular land plants so far found on Earth.
