= Trawool =

- Town
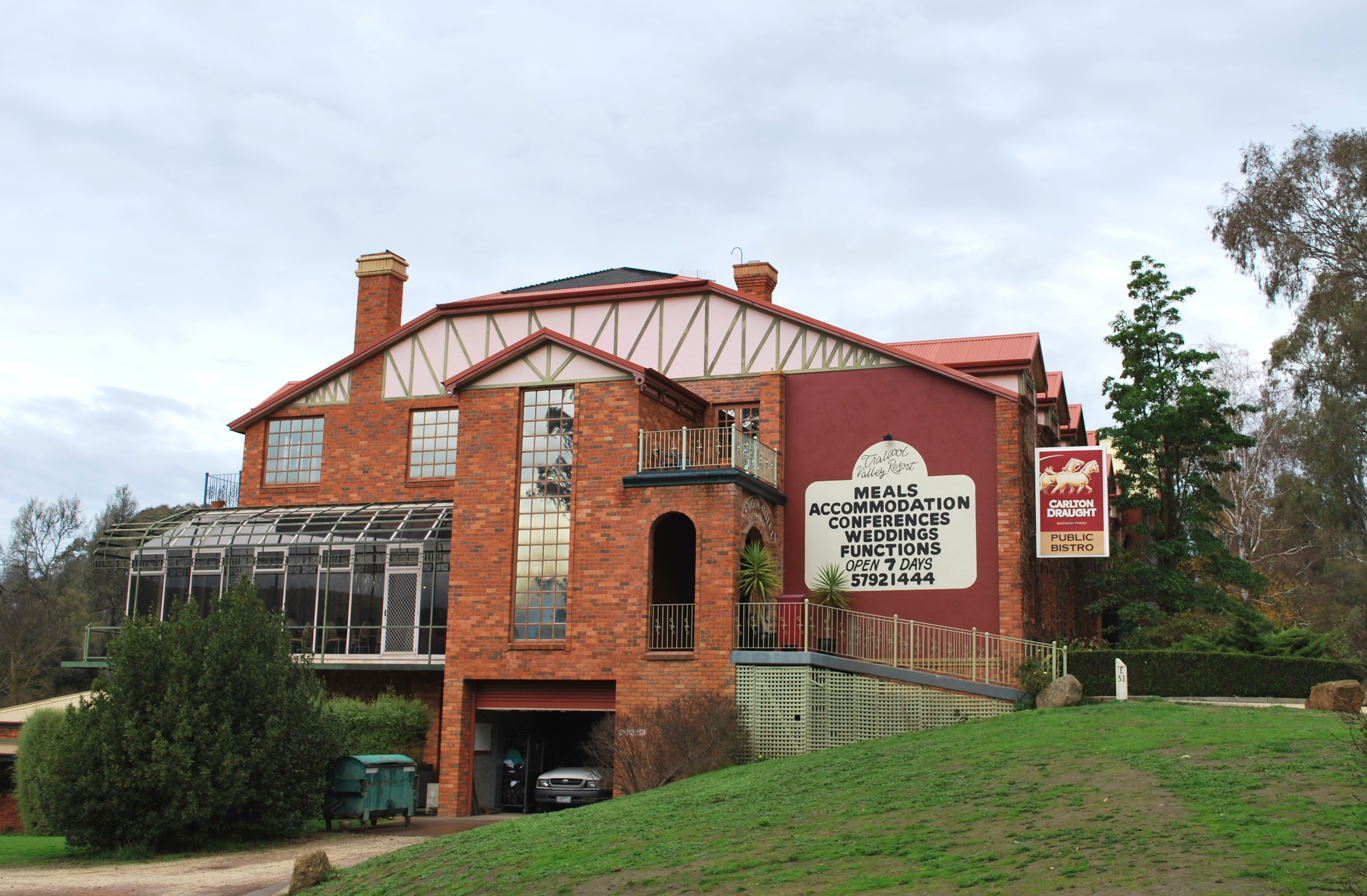
- Trawool Hotel and resort, 2009

- Coordinates: 37°06′0″S 145°13′0″E
- Country: Australia
- State: Victoria
- Region: Hume
- LGAs: Shire of Mitchell; Shire of Murrindindi
- Location: 115 km (71 mi) N of Melbourne; 14 km (8.7 mi) SE of Seymour

Government
  - State electorates: Euroa; Eildon
  - Federal divisions: Indi; Nicholls

Population
  - Total: 90 (2021 census)
- Postcode: 3660
Localities around Trawool
Seymour

Trawool is a locality in central Victoria, Australia. The area lies on the middle reaches of the Goulburn River and on the Goulburn Valley Highway, 115 kilometres (71 mi) north of the state capital, Melbourne.

Originally named Traawool, the indigenous word for 'wild water', the district is dominated by agriculture and scenery.

== History ==
First explored by Hume and Hovell in 1824, it was later settled as a large sheep station.

Michael "Patrick" Burns (Born 1829, Kilrush, County Clare) selected land (now known as Mt Pleasant) once a part of the Tallarook Run in 1867. He had come from Sydney in 1857 to work for Michael Hickey ( Born 1825 Cratloe, County Clare) at Camp Hill, Tallarook. He and his family settled there on 20 March 1871. Burns lobbied for a school and donated the land. A portable school building was erected in 1885 and classes commenced the same year with a Helen McKay as Head Teacher. The Burns were actively involved with the Trawool community throughout the 19th and 20th centuries, including the introduction of the railway, the post office (from 1886 to its closure in 1972), and entertaining servicemen from the Seymour Army Camp.

Trawool Valley Resort is listed in the National Trust Heritage Register recognised for its importance as a scenic, geological and cultural site, and for its great diversity of flora and fauna. By 2018 the resort had fallen into a degree of disrepair, but after an auction in 2018 new owners extensively refurbished the buildings, and it re-opened in late 2019 as The Trawool Estate, an accommodation, dining, and events venue.

The Trawool Hotel was established at a river crossing site. A punt was used to ferry passengers across the river until a bridge was built. When a railway branch line from Tallarook to Yea was created in 1883 the Trawool railway station was built.

After a period of growth in the 1880s, the settlement went into decline although a granite quarry was established in the area in the early 1890s. Australian and American troops were stationed at Trawool during World War II. Electricity arrived in the district in 1945. However Trawool school closed in 1959, the post office relocated in 1972 and the last train travelled on the local railway line in 1978.
