= Yarck railway station =

Former railway station in Victoria, Australia

Coordinates: 37°06′17″S 145°37′01″E

Yarck

General information
- Line: Mansfield

Other information
- Status: Closed

History
- Opened: 10 November 1890
- Closed: 8 November 1978

Services
Preceding station	Disused railways	Following station
Cathkin	Mansfield line	Kanumbra
	List of closed railway stations in Victoria	
Location

Yarck railway station is a former railway station in Yarck, Victoria, Australia. The station was opened in November 1890 when the branch line from Tallarook was extended to Merton. After the station closed along with the line in 1978, the main station building was sold and moved elsewhere. A goods shed, and a passenger shelter in poor condition, remain at the site of the station.

== See also ==
- Victorian Railway Stations - Yarck
