= Molesworth railway station =

Former railway station in Victoria, Australia

Coordinates: 37°10′05″S 145°32′30″E

Molesworth

General information
- Line: Mansfield

Other information
- Status: Closed

History
- Opened: 12 November 1889
- Closed: 8 November 1978

Services
Preceding station	Disused railways	Following station
Cheviot	Mansfield line	Cathkin
	List of closed railway stations in Victoria	
Location

Molesworth is a former railway station on the Mansfield railway line in Molesworth, Victoria, Australia. The station was opened with the line between Yea and Molesworth on 12 November 1889. It was closed with the line from Tallarook to Mansfield on 8 November 1978.
