= Homewood station (disambiguation) =

Homewood station is a train station in Homewood, Illinois. It could also refer to:

- Homewood railway station in Victoria, Australia
- Homewood station (Pittsburgh Regional Transit), a bus rapid transit station in Pittsburgh, Pennsylvania
