= Mansfield railway line =

Former railway line in Victoria, Australia

Mansfield

Overview
- Status: Former railway line Now Great Victorian Rail Trail
- Owner: Victorian Railways (VR) (1883–1974); VR as VicRail (1974–1978)
- Locale: Hume (region), Victoria, Australia
- Termini: Tallarook; Mansfield
- Connecting lines: Tocumwal (Seymour line)
- Former connections: Alexandra
- Stations: 16 former stations; 1 former siding

History
- Opened: 16 November 1883
- Completed: 6 October 1891
- Closed: 8 November 1978

Technical
- Line length: 121.042 km (75.212 mi)
- Number of tracks: Single track
- Track gauge: 1,600 mm (5 ft 3 in)
- Minimum radius: 300 metres (15 chains)
- Highest elevation: 397 metres (1,302 ft)
- Maximum incline: 1 in 40 (2.5%)

The Mansfield railway line is a now-closed 121-kilometre (75 mi) branch railway line situated in the Hume region of Victoria, Australia. Constructed by the Victorian Railways, it branched from the Seymour line at Tallarook station, and ran east to Mansfield. The line was primarily built to provide a general goods and passenger service to settlements in the area.

The line was opened in six stages from November 1883 to October 1891, and was closed in November 1978.

== History ==
=== Determining the alignment ===
By 1873 the North East railway from Melbourne to Wodonga had been completed. On its north east trajectory, the rail line met and crossed the Goulburn River at Seymour. To arrive at Seymour the upper Goulburn River has travelled almost due west from its source near Mansfield close to Woods Point along what is called the Upper Goulburn Valley.

Even before the main rail line had been established, attention had turned to the possibility of a branch rail line that would head east along the Upper Goulburn valley. The alignment was hotly debated.

Those in Broadford favoured a rail link over the Murchison Gap, paralleling the existing road.

At this time the road link to Yea ran from Broadford uphill and due east over the Murchison Gap to Strath Creek. The road then followed the King Parrot Creek downhill and north towards the Goulburn until it reached what today is called Triangle Road. Here it turned east again to reach the Goulburn. From there the road ran south east to Yea. Out of Broadford the gradient was severe. Bullock dray drivers heading from Yea to Broadford down the hill on the boundary of Roderick Murchison's property had to secure the dray by rope to a tree near the summit before attempting the descent.

The alternative alignment was west from today's Triangle Road junction along the river valley to Seymour. The Yea District Road Board was steadily building this road link including a bridge over King Parrot Creek, much to the displeasure of the Broadford District Road Board. In April 1870, floods swept down the upper Goulburn River taking out some upstream bridges.

The railway alignment was a choice between a steep gradient and the risk of flooding.

In 1870, several delegations met with Wilson, the Commissioner of Railways. The Broadford Road Board wanted the connection to be made at Broadford and the line made over the Murchison Gap to Yea. Representatives from Yea and the Upper Goulburn argued for the junction at Seymour as it would be 'eight miles [13 km] shorter and more easily made'.

By the end of that year, it became clear the 'best and natural' alignment for the road was along the south bank of the River from Seymour to Yea. 'The present surveyed road is so level in its course, that the construction of a line of rail or tramway could be effected at the lowest cost of such works, and may be looked upon as not far distant.' Compared to the Broadford alignment there was not a 'hill worth mentioning'.'

=== The League ===
In November 1873, in Alexandra, the Upper Goulburn Valley Railway League was formed to 'promote the construction of a branch line of railway from the north-eastern line [at Seymour] to Jamieson, via the Goulburn Valley.' Support was invited from the Alexandra and Seymour Shire Councils, from the Road Boards in Yea and Howqua as well as the Woodspoint Borough Council.

A fortnight later a meeting in Mansfield debated the merits of a rail connection north to Benalla or west to Yea and Seymour.

In June 1874, representatives of the League met with Gillies the Commissioner for Railways and secured a promise that 'as soon as surveyors were available a survey would be made'. The Minister was good to his word and the survey party arrived in August of that year. By February the next year the survey party was a few kilometres from Alexandra.

In July 1875, the Alexandra Times reported confidence that the Upper Goulburn Railway would be 'recommended to Parliament in the next group of lines.' It also noted that a surveyor was at work investigating a route to Mansfield via Merton. A correspondent urged Mansfield and Alexandra to unite behind a line through Merton [rather than Mansfield to Benalla] and suggested that a station at Cathkin would be in the interests of Alexandra.

By May 1876 there were rumours that the Government was 'contemplating' among other lines, a railway from Tallaarook to Jamieson, a distance of around 180 km with an estimated cost of £500,000.

The delegation that met Jones, the Commissioner for Railways, in October 1876, proposed a line that ran Tallarook, Yea, Molesworth, then via Alexandra to Jamieson and then to Mansfield. In his response Jones said that the cost of each segment exceeded the limit set by the Parliament.

In June 1877, the proposed line ran from Tallarook or Seymour, Yea, Molesworth, Gobur, Merton, Doon, Maindample, Mansfield. In August 1877 a delegation from Mansfield, Howqua and Alexandra met Woods the Commissioner for Railways. Woods said he was in favour of the line but could not promise that it would be constructed.

In March 1878, Woods, the Minister of Railways and Mines made a visit to the Upper Goulburn to personally investigate the claim for a railway. By now the proposal was to 'tap the North-Eastern line at Tallarook or Seymour, then pass through Yea, Kathkin (which would be the station for Alexandra) and Merton to Mansfield. In a banquet speech at the Yea Shire Hall, the Minister 'promised to include in the next Railway Bill a line up the valley of the Goulburn via Yea. (Great excitement and prolonged cheering.)'

In January 1879, it was reported that Alexandra had agreed to a rail alignment that bypassed the town.

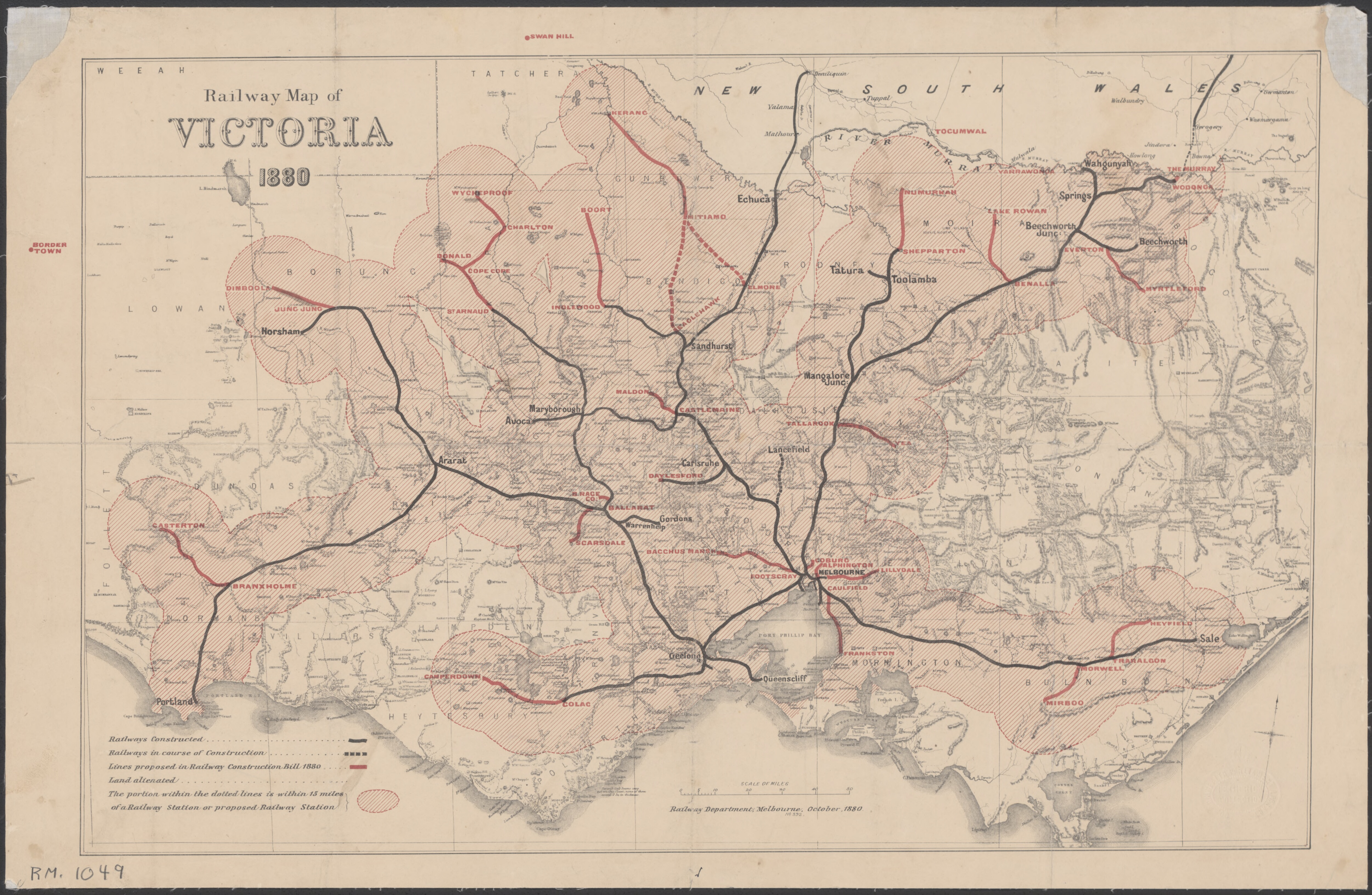
Railway map of Victoria, 1880 showing planned line construction

In October 1880, Berry's Minister of Railways, Patterson, introduced a Bill to Parliament that proposed to spend £2,356,490 on 23 new rail lines. The Bill, once passed, authorised the construction of a railway from Tallarook to Yea. It was understood that the eventual terminus would be Mansfield, but even at that stage there was still uncertainty about whether the line from Yea would pass through Peppins Flat and Alexandra or over the 1 in 30 grade of the Puzzle Range. Both alignments being considered equally practicable.

=== First stage: Tallarook to Yea ===
==== Alignment ====
By August 1881, the permanent (final) survey party had completed their work on the more challenging section from Tallarook to the area east of King Parrot Creek. Apart from the Creek crossing, the line in this section would require much sideling work (cutting and filling) along the hillsides south of the River as well as dealing with the 'huge masses of stone and gigantic boulders which stud the sides of the ranges'. Locals hoped that the final alignment would go 'by way of Alexandra, through the fertile and thickly-populated district of Thornton, to Peppin's Flat, and from thence to Mansfield, this route being the most suitable for the Jamieson people as well as the best for Alexandra.' Today the Goulburn Valley Highway B340 follows this route from Cathkin to Thornton.

==== Construction ====
By June 1882, tenders for construction for a broad gauge line had been invited. In September there was a last ditch effort by people in Seymour to have the branch connect there rather than at Tallarook. Contracts were let in September and by November the following year, the 'leviathan contractors' C & E Millar had completed the construction of the line at a cost of £97,700 or £4,117 a mile - twice the cost of the Myrtleford line. This cost reflected the sidelining noted above. Many of the spurs contained huge boulders of granite piled up in 'fantastical combinations'. 'The blasting operations ...were of a very extensive character'. The bridges were 'numerous and in some cases of considerable length and height.'

Intermediate stations were constructed at Trawool (11 km) Wrights Siding (3 km) (later Trawool Falls, then Granite), Windham (6 km) (later Kerrisdale), and Homewood. (10 km). Yea was a further 9 km.

==== Quality ====
The Tallarook Yea line was constructed with relatively tight curves and steep grades typical of the 'light lines' built in Victoria in the 1870s and beyond. In places there were successive curves with a radius of 300m (15 chains) and gradients of 2.5% (1:40). These parameters can be compared to the Melbourne Bendigo Echuca line (1864) built to the English main line standard with curves no tighter than 800m and gradients no greater than 2%. Today's Inland Rail line has a minimum curve radius of 800m and a maximum gradient of 1.25%.

The 'light' broad gauge lines were cheaper to build, but the tighter curves and steep gradients limited the loads which increased the cost per passenger or per tonne of freight. At times a Yea-bound train, when it reached Granite Station (near Falls Creek) would detach half the carriages so that it could negotiate the successive tight curves and steep climb over the spur to King Parrot Creek and Kerrisdale Station. There it would leave the first half of the train. The locomotive would return to Granite and bring forward the rest of the train to Kerrisdale where the train was reunited before continuing to Yea.

==== Opening ====
The line opened on Tuesday, 20 November 1883.

The opening was celebrated in Yea with a general holiday. The streets were thronged and decorated with the flags of 'most every' nation in the world and Chinese lanterns. The Ministerial train arrived at 2.30pm in time for the banquet held at Oliver's Commercial (now Country Club) Hotel. Guests included Gillies, Deakin and Hunt (the local member). In his speech the Shire President reminded the guests of the efforts by the publicans and the squatters to take the railway round by Murchison's Hill. Deakin, being received with cheers, spoke of efforts to make Australia a united country. He said he hoped that the future would find Australia a united nation with one Government (Cheers.) . Hunt and Gillies then continued to Alexandra for a similar celebration at the Corner Hotel. They were careful not to promise the railway would come through Alexandra.

==== Connections & fares ====
People in Alexandra could get to the train by catching Seaton's coach service from the Mount Pleasant Hotel (4s each way). The alternative service provided by Cobb & Co (5s) left for Alexandra when the train arrived in Yea. The coach left the Corner Hotel in Alexandra at 11:00, in time to catch the outbound train service from Yea.

A first class train ticket from Yea to Melbourne cost 13s. The journey to Tallarook took 75 minutes. Then there was a half hour wait at Tallarook for the Melbourne train. From Tallarook to Melbourne took ~2 hours and 40 minutes.

The first stage of the line was opened from Tallarook to Yea in 1883, being extended in stages from 1889 through Molesworth, Cathkin, Merton and Maindample, to reach Mansfield in 1891. A 7-kilometre-long branch was opened from Cathkin to Koriella in 1890, being extended another 7 kilometres to Alexandra in 1909.

The line was a result of a decade of local lobbying, and provided improved access for agricultural products from the region to Melbourne markets. The line was quite scenic, and included a 200 m tunnel near Cheviot and a viaduct over an arm of the Lake Eildon reservoir in Bonnie Doon, which was rebuilt in 1955 as part of the enlarging of the reservoir.

=== Deterioration & closure ===
By the mid-1970s, the track had deteriorated beyond Yea and, after March 1977, the majority of passenger services were run by buses. The last regular passenger service to Mansfield, on 28 May 1977, was operated by 280hp Walker railmotor 91 RM. It was replaced by a bus service via Yarra Glen, which was rerouted via Whittlesea after road upgrades had been carried out.

The line was closed on 8 November 1978, along with the branch line to Alexandra. It was quickly dismantled following closure, preventing any chance of tourist services from operating along the line, despite some interest being shown. Many bridges along the line were also removed with only the abutments and piers remaining. The trackbed has since been re-used for the 134-kilometre Great Victorian Rail Trail. Construction of the trail was funded by the federal government and local councils.

== Stations ==
Station Histories
Station	Opened	Closed	Age	Notes
Tallarook	18 April 1872		154 years	
Trawool	16 November 1883	25 July 1977	93 years	Formerly Traawool
Granite	15 December 1892	1 December 1951	58 years	Formerly Falls Siding / Falls Creek Siding / Trawool Falls Siding / Wright & Cons Siding
Kerrisdale	16 November 1883	8 November 1978	94 years	
Homewood	16 November 1883	8 November 1978	94 years	
Yea	16 November 1883	8 November 1978	94 years	
Cheviot	12 November 1889	8 November 1978	88 years	
Molesworth	12 November 1889	8 November 1978	88 years	
Cathkin	10 June 1890	8 November 1978	88 years	
Yarck	10 November 1890	8 November 1978	87 years	
Kanumbra	10 November 1890	8 November 1978	87 years	
Merton	10 November 1890	8 November 1978	87 years	
Woodfield	7 May 1891	8 November 1978	87 years	
Bonnie Doon	7 May 1891	8 November 1978	87 years	Formerly Doon
Maindample	7 May 1891	8 November 1978	87 years	
Phosphate Coys Siding	15 January 1920	29 January 1957	37 years	
Mansfield	6 October 1891	8 November 1978	87 years	
