= Kerrisdale railway station =

Former railway station in Victoria, Australia

Coordinates: 37.1410°S 145.2629°E

Kerrisdale

General information
- Line: Mansfield

Other information
- Status: Closed

History
- Opened: 16 November 1883
- Closed: 8 November 1978

Services
Preceding station	Disused railways	Following station
Granite	Mansfield line	Homewood
	List of closed railway stations in Victoria	
Location

Kerrisdale was a railway station located in Kerrisdale, Victoria, Australia, on the Mansfield line.

The station consisted of a side platform, goods shed and a goods platform and a cattle ramp which was abolished in 1976.
