= Molesworth, Victoria =

Molesworth
- Town
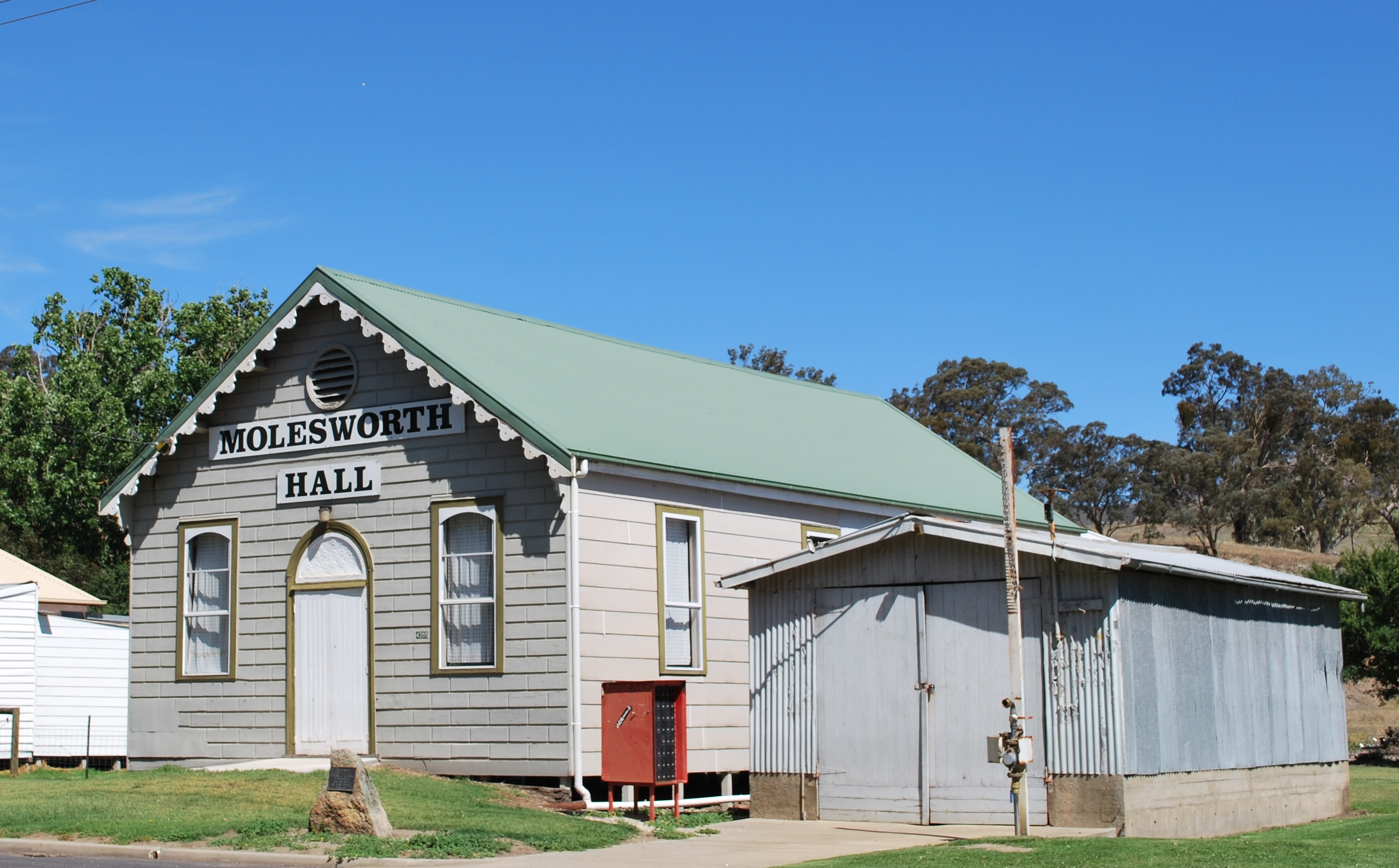
- Molesworth Hall

- Interactive map of Molesworth
- Coordinates: 37°09′36″S 145°32′22″E
- Country: Australia
- State: Victoria
- Region: Hume
- LGA: Shire of Murrindindi
- Location: 125 km (78 mi) NE of Melbourne; 64 km (40 mi) W of Mansfield; 20 km (12 mi) NW of Alexandra; 13 km (8.1 mi) NE of Yea

Government
  - State electorate: Eildon
  - Federal division: Indi

Area
  - Total: 88.8 km^{2} (34.3 sq mi)
- Elevation: 175 m (574 ft)

Population
  - Total: 91 (2021 census)
  - Density: 1.025/km^{2} (2.654/sq mi)
- Postcode: 3718
- County: Anglesey
Localities around Molesworth
Highlands	Caveat	Yarck
Killingworth	Molesworth	Cathkin
Yea	Limestone	Whanregarwen

Molesworth is a town in the Shire of Murrindindi, Victoria, Australia. The town is located on the Goulburn Valley Highway, 125 kilometres (78 mi) northeast of the state capital, Melbourne.

Molesworth Post Office was opened on 1 January 1875 and was closed on 30 June 1994. The railway arrived in 1890 and the station was closed in 1978.

Facilities in the town include a caravan park/campground, general store and public hall.
