= Merton railway station =

Former railway station in Victoria, Australia

Coordinates: 36°58′47″S 145°42′53″E

Merton

General information
- Line: Mansfield

Other information
- Status: Closed

History
- Opened: 10 November 1890
- Closed: 8 November 1978

Services
Preceding station	Disused railways	Following station
Kanumbra	Mansfield line	Woodfield
	List of closed railway stations in Victoria	
Location

Merton is a railway station in Merton, Victoria, Victoria, Australia. In 1974, it became a no-one-in-charge station. More recently, it was refurbished as a museum.

The stock yards, platforms, goods shed and gate keeper's cottage were constructed between October 1890 and April 1891. The last passenger train ran through Merton on 28 May 1977, and the last goods train in February 1978.
