= Matilda Alice Williams =

Matilda Alice Williams (1875–1973) was a New Zealand Methodist deaconess. She was born in Alexandra, Victoria, Australia in 1875.
