= Cheviot, Victoria =

Cheviot
- Town
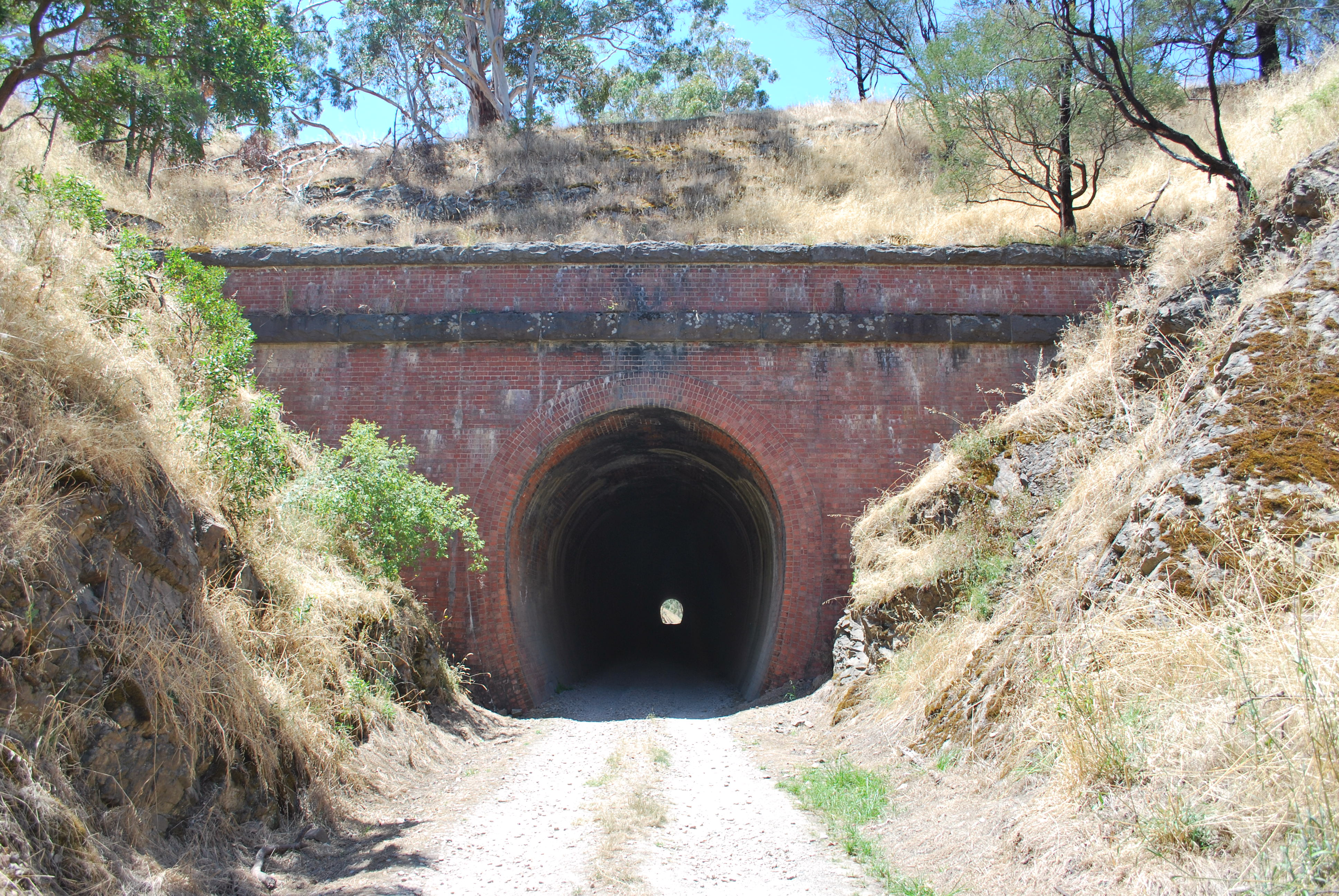
- The historic railway tunnel at Cheviot

- Coordinates: 37°13′S 145°28′E
- Country: Australia
- State: Victoria
- Region: Hume
- LGA: Shire of Murrindindi

Government
  - State electorate: Eildon
  - Federal division: Indi
- Postcode: 3717

Cheviot is a locality in Victoria, Australia in the Shire of Murrindindi local government area.

== History ==
The locality was named after a nearby pastoral run called Cheviot Hills, which in turn was named after the locality on the English-Scottish border. It was also called Ross Creek. From 1889 until 1978 there was an active railway station here on the now historic and abandoned Cheviot railway station which took route on the Mansfield-Tallarook line. Cheviot Post Office opened on 9 April 1890 after the arrival of the railway, and closed in 1944. The rails have gone but an old goods shed survives, and to the northeast the Cheviot Tunnel provides an excellent example of brick workmanship of the nineteenth century.

A Ross Creek Post Office opened on 14 October 1865 and closed in 1969.
