= Merton, Victoria =

Merton
- Town
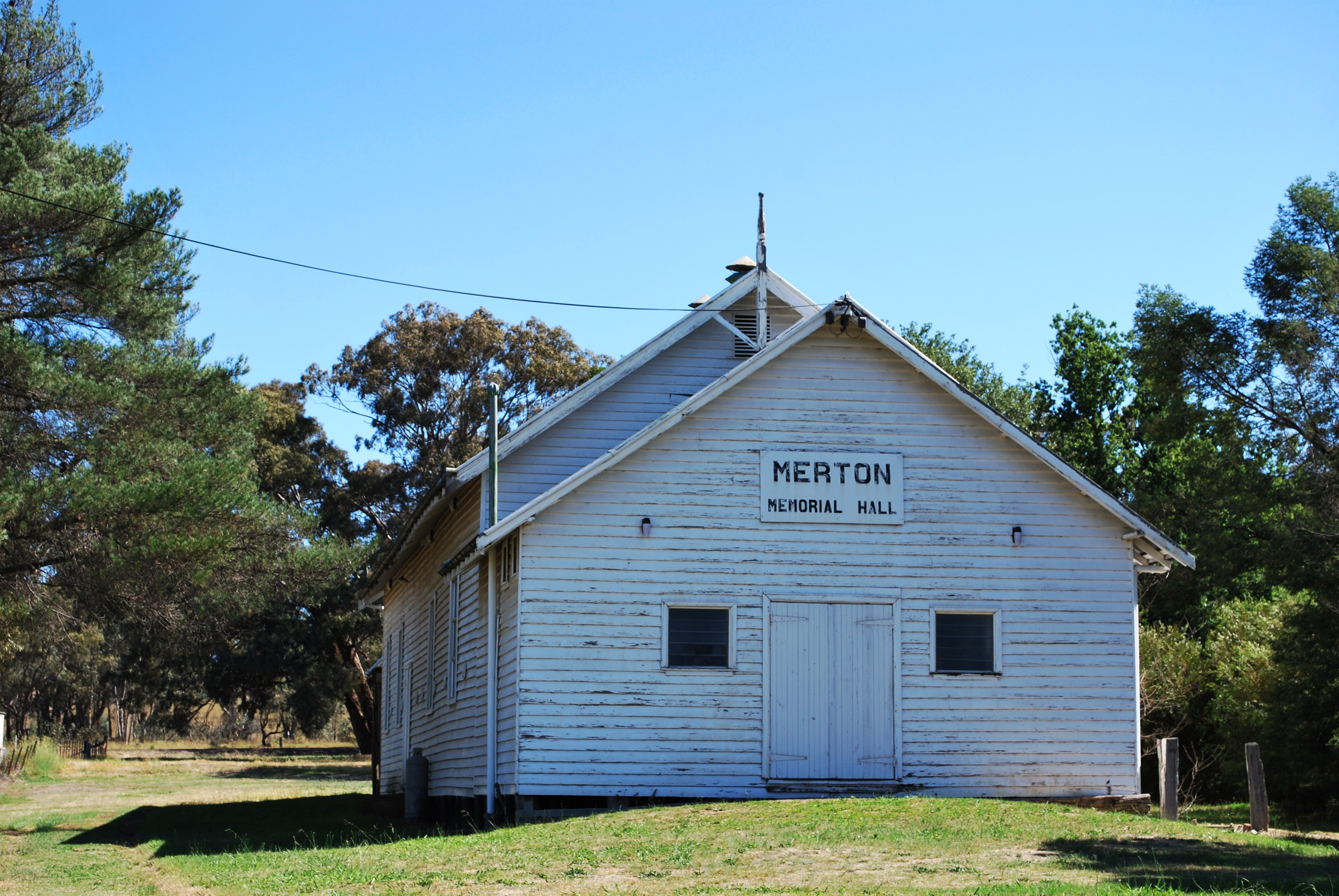
- Memorial hall

- Interactive map of Merton
- Coordinates: 36°59′S 145°43′E
- Country: Australia
- State: Victoria
- Region: Hume
- LGAs: Shire of Mansfield; Shire of Murrindindi
- Location: 148 km (92 mi) NE of Melbourne; 36 km (22 mi) W of Mansfield; 38 km (24 mi) NE of Yea

Government
  - State electorate: Eildon
  - Federal division: Indi

Population
  - Total: 216 (2021 census)
- Postcode: 3715
- Annual rainfall: 689.5 mm (27.15 in)

Merton is a locality on the Maroondah Highway in north-east Victoria, west of Bonnie Doon, Australia. At the 2021 census, Merton had a population of 216.

Merton Post Office opened on 1 July 1858.

The railway to Mansfield arrived in the locality from Tallarook in 1890, and closed on 18 November 1978. The last passenger service was on 28 May 1977.

Merton has a picnic horse racing club, the Merton Amateur Turf Club (established in 1865), which holds its one race meeting a year with the Merton Cup on New Year's Day.

Merton Memorial Hall was opened on 20 June 1923, under the official title of Merton Mechanics' Institute. Its name was changed to the current one in 1944.
