= Isabel Clifton Cookson =

Australian botanist and palaeobotanist (1893–1973)

Isabel Clifton Cookson (25 December 1893 – 1 July 1973) was an Australian botanist who specialised in palaeobotany and palynology.

== Early years and education ==
Cookson was born at Hawthorn, Victoria, and attended the Methodist Ladies' College at Kew where she gained honours in anatomy, physiology and botany in the senior public examination. Cookson went on to study for her BSc at the University of Melbourne and graduated in 1916 with majors in botany and zoology.

== Career ==
When she completed her studies she became a demonstrator at the university, and between 1916 and 1917 received a government research scholarship and the MacBain research scholarship in biology, amongst other awards to study the flora of the Northern Territory. She contributed illustrations for the 1917 book The Flora of the Northern Territory by Alfred J. Ewart and O. B. Davies.

She continued working at the University of Melbourne, until she visited the Imperial College of Science and Technology between 1925 and 1926, and, on a return visit in the University of Manchester between 1926 and 1927. At Manchester she began a long and productive academic relationship with W. H. Lang, Lang named the genus Cooksonia in her honour. From 1929 her research focussed on palaeobotany, she wrote several papers on fossil plants including early vascular plants from the Silurian and Early Devonian which helped to shape theories of early land-plant evolution. She also studied more recent coal forming deposits. Her work on the early terrestrial fossil plants of Victoria and field work showing associated graptolites and plants led to her research thesis and to a D.Sc. from the University of Melbourne in 1932.

In 1930 she was appointed lecturer in botany at the University of Melbourne. From the 1940s she worked on fossil spores, pollen and phytoplankton and their relationship with palaeogeography and championed the usefulness of plant microfossils for oil exploration. The Council for Scientific and Industrial Research established in 1949 a pollen research unit under her leadership. In 1952 she was appointed a research fellow in botany, and retired in 1959. She was active in her retirement, 30 of her 86 scientific papers were published after 1959.

Since 1976 the Botanical Society of America has awarded the Isabel Cookson Award to the best paper on palaeobotany presented at their annual meeting at the bequest of Cookson. Cookson Place in the Canberra suburb of Banks is also named in her honour.

== In popular culture ==
Henki, the 2021 album by British folk singer Richard Dawson and Finnish band Circle, features a song titled "Cooksonia", which lyrically details elements of Cookson's life and work.

== See also ==
- Yea Flora Fossil Site
- Baragwanathia
