= Granite railway station =

Former railway station in Victoria, Australia

Granite
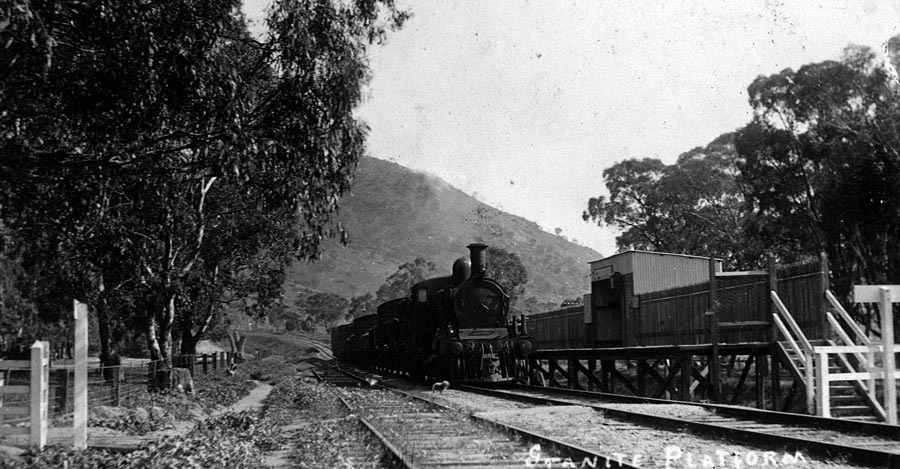

General information
- Line: Mansfield

Other information
- Status: Closed

History
- Opened: 15 December 1892
- Closed: 1 December 1951

Services
Preceding station	Disused railways	Following station
Trawool	Mansfield line	Kerrisdale
	List of closed railway stations in Victoria	

Granite was a small railway station located at Granite, on the Mansfield line in Victoria, Australia.

It was opened as Falls Siding in 1892, to serve a nearby granite quarry, and had been renamed Granite by 1904. The station consisted of a wooden platform and was not staffed. Little used, it was closed in December 1951.
