= Cheviot railway station =

Former railway station in Victoria, Australia

Coordinates: 37°13′53″S 145°27′57″E

Cheviot

General information
- Line: Mansfield

Other information
- Status: Closed

History
- Opened: 10 June 1890
- Closed: 8 November 1978

Services
Preceding station	Disused railways	Following station
Yea	Mansfield line	Molesworth
	List of closed railway stations in Victoria	
Location

Cheviot is a former railway station in Cheviot, Victoria, Australia. The tracks and buildings (except for an old shed) have been removed.
