= Yea Flora Fossil Site =

Natural national heritage site in Yea VIC

Coordinates: 37°13′15″S 145°26′57″E

The Yea Flora Fossil Site is a roadside cutting on Limestone Road, Yea, Victoria, Australia. It contains fossils of genus Baragwanathia, some of the world's earliest vascular plants dating back to the begin of the Devonian period, 415 million years ago.

The fossils were discovered in 1875, but the significance was not recognized until they were studied in the 1930s by Australian botanist Isabel Cookson. Her work overturned long held scientific understandings of how and when plants evolved.

The site is listed on the Australian National Heritage List.

== See also ==
- List of fossil sites
