= Woodfield railway station =

Former railway station in Victoria, Australia

Coordinates: 37°01′10″S 145°48′02″E

Woodfield

General information
- Line: Mansfield
- Platforms: 2
- Tracks: 6

Other information
- Status: Closed

History
- Opened: 7 May 1891
- Closed: 8 November 1978

Services
Preceding station	Disused railways	Following station
Merton	Mansfield line	Bonnie Doon
	List of closed railway stations in Victoria	
Location

Woodfield is a former railway station in Woodfield, Victoria, Australia. There is no longer a station building at the site of the station. A goods yard also once existed, and was used to load and unload grain trains.
