= Homewood railway station =

Former railway station in Victoria, Australia

Coordinates: 37°11′42″S 145°20′09″E

Homewood

General information
- Line: Mansfield
- Platforms: 2
- Tracks: 2

Other information
- Status: Closed

History
- Opened: 16 November 1883
- Closed: 8 November 1978

Services
Preceding station	Disused railways	Following station
Kerrisdale	Mansfield line	Yea
	List of closed railway stations in Victoria	
Location

Homewood is a former railway station in Homewood, Victoria, Australia. There is no longer a station building at the site, and the tracks have been removed.
