= Cathkin, Victoria =

Cathkin
- Town
- Coordinates: 37°09′S 145°35′E
- Country: Australia
- State: Victoria
- Region: Hume
- LGA: Shire of Murrindindi

Population
  - Total: 27 (2021 census)
- Postcode: 3714

Cathkin is a locality in Central Victoria, in Australia. It is a small stop along the Goulburn Valley Highway, and is approximately 100 km North from Melbourne.

The railway to Mansfield arrived in the locality from Tallarook in 1890, being closed on 18 November 1978. The last passenger service was on 28 May 1977.

Cathkin was the junction of a short branch railway to Koriella, which opened in September 1890 and was later extended to Alexandra in 1909. The branch closed at the same time as the line to Mansfield.
