= Tallarook railway station =

Railway station in Victoria, Australia

Tallarook
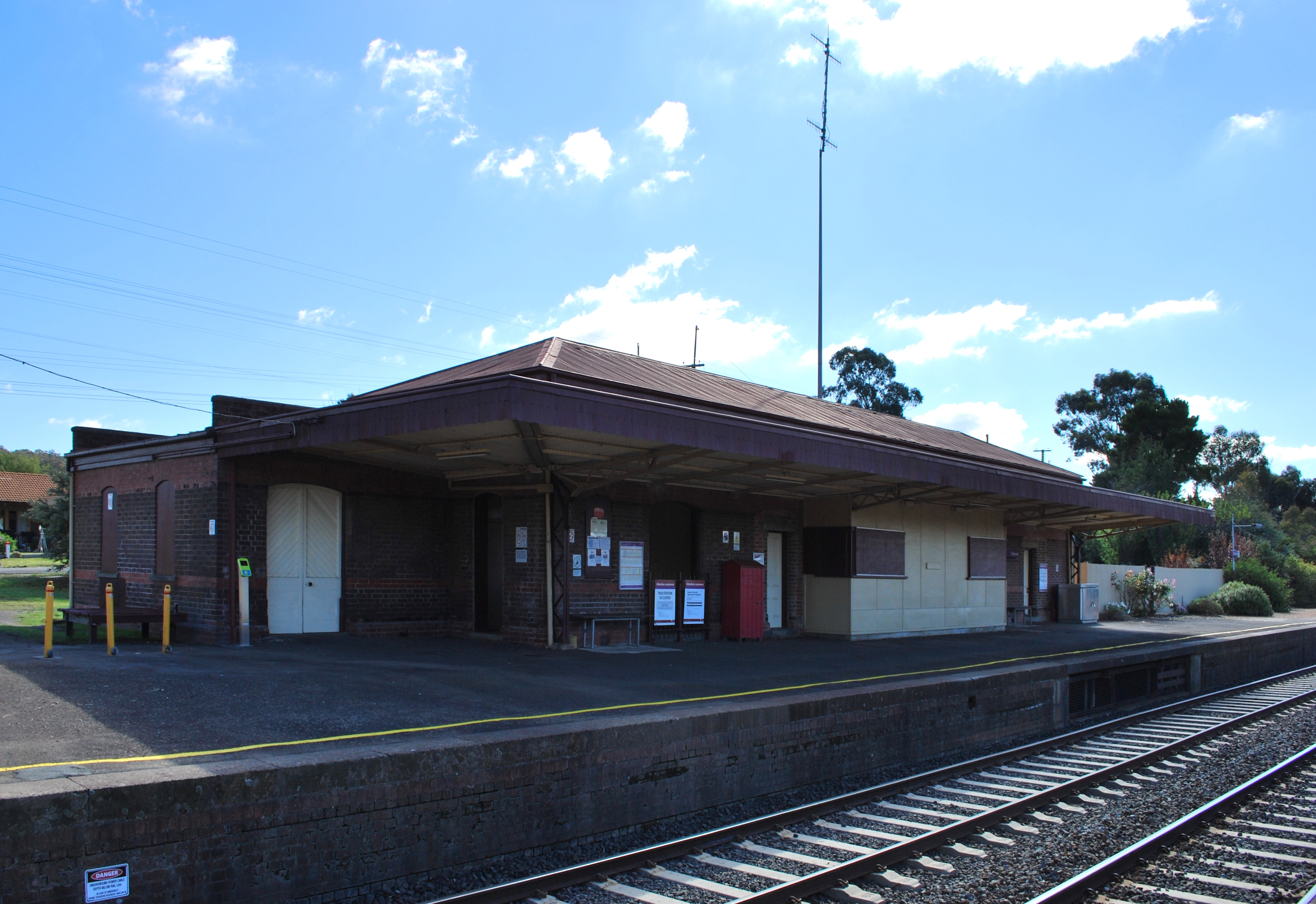
- Station building on Platform 2, April 2012

General information
- Location: Sanctuary Road, Tallarook, Victoria 3659; Shire of Mitchell; Australia
- Coordinates: 37.0923°S 145.1027°E
- System: PTV regional rail station
- Owner: VicTrack
- Operator: V/Line
- Lines: Seymour Shepparton (Tocumwal)
- Distance: 90.21 kilometres from Southern Cross
- Platforms: 2 side
- Tracks: 3

Construction
- Structure type: Ground
- Cycle facilities: Yes
- Accessible: Yes

Other information
- Status: Operational, unstaffed
- Station code: TOK
- Fare zone: Myki zone 5/6
- Website: Public Transport Victoria

History
- Opened: 18 April 1872; 154 years ago
- Rebuilt: 1978

Services
| Preceding station | V/Line | Following station |
|---|---|---|
| Broadford towards Southern Cross | Seymour line | Seymour Terminus |
| Broadford towards Southern Cross | Shepparton line Limited service | Seymour towards Shepparton |
Former services
| Preceding station | Disused railways | Following station |
|---|---|---|
| Junction | Mansfield line | Trawool |
Location
- Location within Victoria

Tallarook railway station is a regional railway station operated by V/Line on the Tocumwal, Shepparton and Seymour lines, part of the Victoria rail network. It serves the town of Tallarook, in Victoria, Australia. Tallarook is a ground-level unstaffed station, featuring two side platforms. The station opened on 18 April 1872, with the current station provided in 1978.

== History ==
Tallarook station opened on 18 April 1872, along with the line though it, and became a junction for the Mansfield branch line to Yea in 1883, with the line extended to Mansfield in 1891, and Alexandra in 1909. A turntable was provided when the station became a junction, and the main line was duplicated from Broadford in the same year, with the double track extended north in 1886. The first interlocked signal box was erected in 1885, controlling three platforms and a four road yard. The crossovers for the branch line initially faced Seymour, requiring Melbourne-bound trains to reverse; a Melbourne-facing crossover was added in 1911.

When the parallel standard gauge line was built in 1961, it cut right through the middle of the station, with three gauge crossings provided between the broad gauge main line and the sidings on the other side. A new signal box was also opened around this time, with a crossing loop on the standard gauge line opening in 1969, the only one added after the initial construction of the line.

The current Main Road underpass, located nearby in the Albury (down) direction of the station, was provided in 1961, and replaced a previous level crossing. By June 1970, the turntable was removed.

Tallarook served as the junction for the Mansfield line until 1978, with the last regular passenger train to Mansfield operating in 1977. After the line to Mansfield was closed, one of the gauge crossings was removed in 1979, with another removed at the Albury end in 1981. The goods yard was closed by November 1982, with the last connection to the goods yard abolished in 1984, but the signals for them remained, until the signal box was closed in 1987, and the station left as straight track.

Work on extending Tallarook Loop on the standard gauge line into a 6.8-kilometre-long passing lane commenced in 2008. Work included extending the existing loop southwards, installation of higher speed points at each end, and resignalling.

Former station School House Lane / Dysart Sidings / Goulburn Junction was located between Tallarook and Seymour.

== Platforms and services ==
Tallabrook has two side platforms. It is serviced by V/Line Seymour line and selected Shepparton line services, with ≈25% of Shepparton line services running express through the station.

Tallarook platform arrangement
| Platform | Line | Destination |
|---|---|---|
| 1 | Seymour line Shepparton line | Southern Cross |
| 2 | Seymour line Shepparton line | Seymour, Shepparton |
