= Trawool railway station =

Former railway station in Victoria, Australia

Coordinates: 37.0960°S 145.2076°E

Trawool
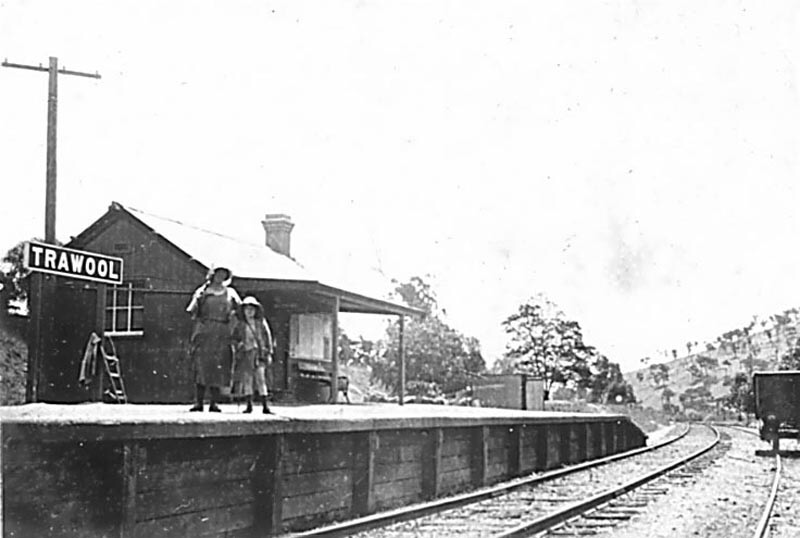

General information
- Line: Mansfield
- Platforms: 1
- Tracks: 1 with loop siding

Other information
- Status: Closed

History
- Opened: 16 November 1883
- Closed: 8 November 1978

Services
Preceding station	Disused railways	Following station
Tallarook	Mansfield line	Granite
	List of closed railway stations in Victoria	
Location

Trawool was a small railway station located on the Mansfield line. A loop siding was also provided and was used for express trains and freight trains to pass regular trains.
