= Yea railway station =

Former railway station in Victoria, Australia

Yea
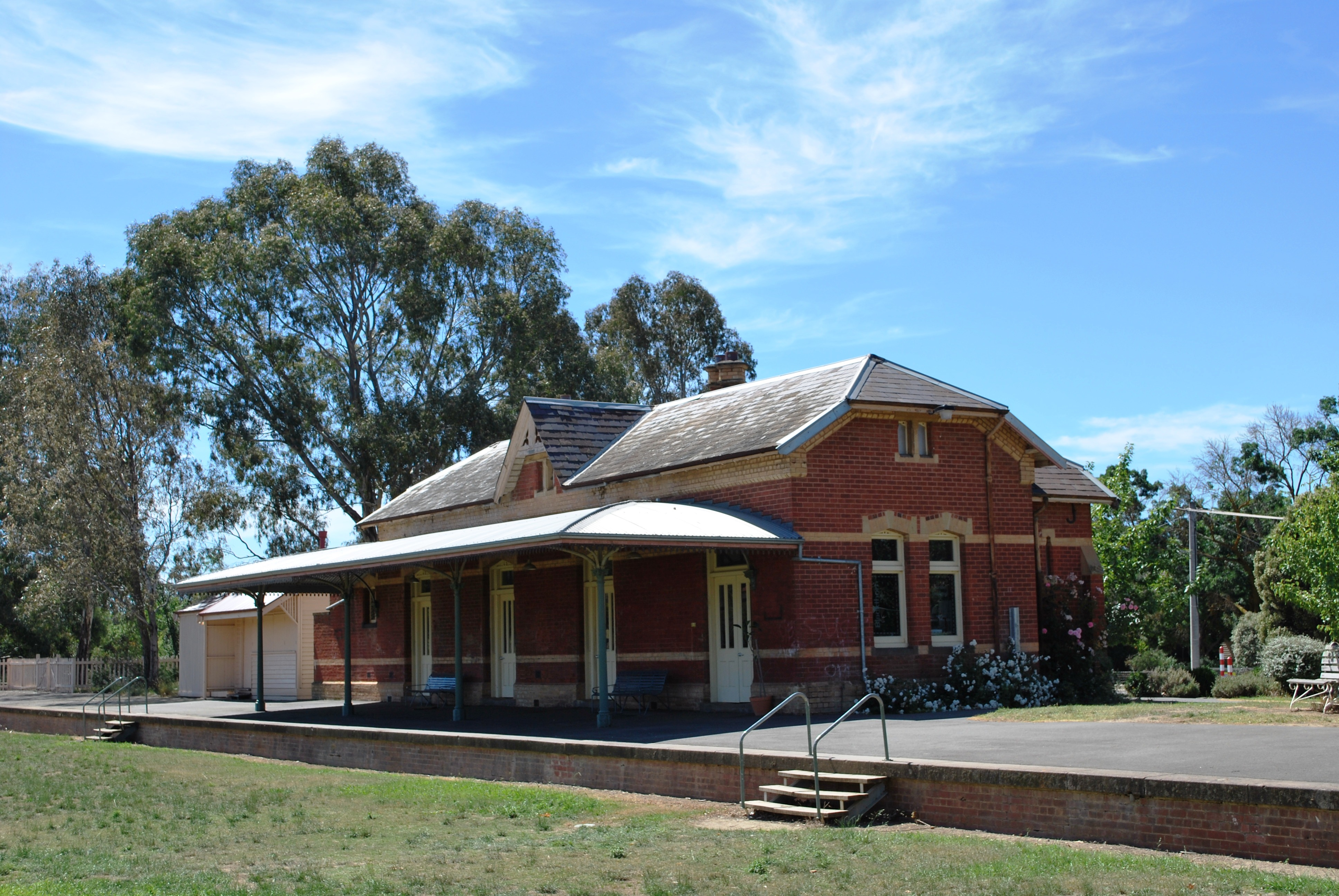
- Station building and platform, December 2008

General information
- Coordinates: 37°12′49″S 145°25′41″E
- Line: Mansfield

Other information
- Status: Closed

History
- Opened: 16 November 1883
- Closed: 8 November 1978

Services
Preceding station	Disused railways	Following station
Homewood	Mansfield line	Cheviot
	List of closed railway stations in Victoria	
Location

Yea is a former railway station on the Mansfield railway line in Yea, Victoria, Australia. It opened with the line in November 1883 and closed with the line in November 1978. There was a refreshment room at the station from 1891. In 1976, the platform was shortened from 91.5m to 85.5m.

The station reserve has been turned into the five-hectare Yea Railway Park. The tracks have been removed, and the station building, dating from 1889, has been restored, as has the goods shed. There is a picnic shelter, barbecue, toilets, playground, skatepark, walking track and community reserve, along with a Rotary park.

The station building houses Blackthorn Textiles, a privately-run craft shop, and the former goods shed is available for hire. The Yea Country Market is held in the park on the first Saturday of each month, and local artists hold an exhibition and sale in the goods shed each Easter.

The station building is listed on the Victorian Heritage Register.
