= Mansfield railway station, Victoria =

Former railway station in Victoria, Australia

Coordinates: 37°03′03″S 146°05′01″E

Mansfield
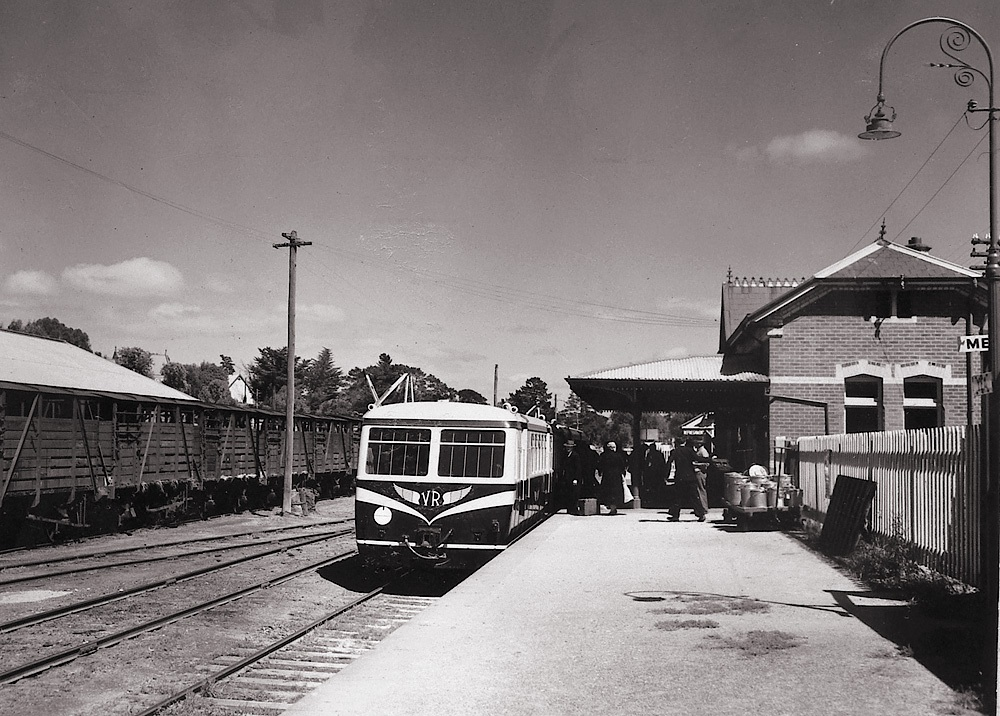

General information
- Line: Mansfield

Other information
- Status: Closed

History
- Opened: 7 May 1891
- Closed: 8 November 1978

Services
Preceding station	Disused railways	Following station
Maindample	Mansfield line	Terminus
	List of closed railway stations in Victoria	
Location

Mansfield is a former railway station in Mansfield, Victoria, Australia. The former station building now serves tourists to the community as a visitor centre.

The station is of a traditional timber design, and features many original fixtures including pressed metal interior walls, original doors and timber panelling and a full length signal bay window. Original light fittings are also in place inside the station building.

Additional structures on site include a large goods shed, bearing a warning notice "DANGER - UNSTABLE STRUCTURE - DO NOT ENTER". A crane is also located in what was the goods yard on the Mansfield goods platform.

The station is the terminus of the former Tallarook - Yea - Mansfield Line. The Mansfield train service ran its last service in 1978, with a Walker Rail Motor on stretches of track that in parts had 15 mph (24 km/h) speed restrictions due to lack of track maintenance by the state government owned Victorian Railways. Goods and freight services continued on the line until six months later, when they were also discontinued.

The rail was dismantled ten years later, and part of the former rail reserve has been used in road and highway re-alignments. The whole of the line from Tallarook to Mansfield has been developed into the Great Victorian Rail Trail, a crushed gravel walking, bicycle and equestrian path. There is no anticipated return of rail services to Mansfield.
