= Homewood, Victoria =

Homewood
- Town
- Coordinates: 37°11′S 145°18′E
- Country: Australia
- State: Victoria
- Region: Hume
- LGA: Shire of Murrindindi

Government
  - State electorate: Eildon
  - Federal division: Indi

Population
  - Total: 70 (2021 census)
- Postcode: 3717

Homewood is a locality in Victoria, Australia. It is part of the Shire of Murrindindi, and had a population of 70 in 2021.

The Homewood area was originally home to the Taungurung people, until European settlers arrived in 1837.

It is the former site of the Homewood railway station that closed in 1978 and was named after early settler James Homewood.

Homewood is also home to local fauna Striped legless lizard, Eastern Banjo Frog, and Spotted marsh frog.

== Demography ==
At the 2021 census, Homewood had a population of 70, up from 54 in the 2016 census. Census records show the population only for 2016 and 2021, whereas in previous years it was counted as part of Strath Creek.

The median age in Homewood was 55 in 2021, and 42 in 2016. The Median weekly household income in 2021 was $1,166 and in 2016 was $1,208.
