= Alexandra, Victoria =

Alexandra
- Town
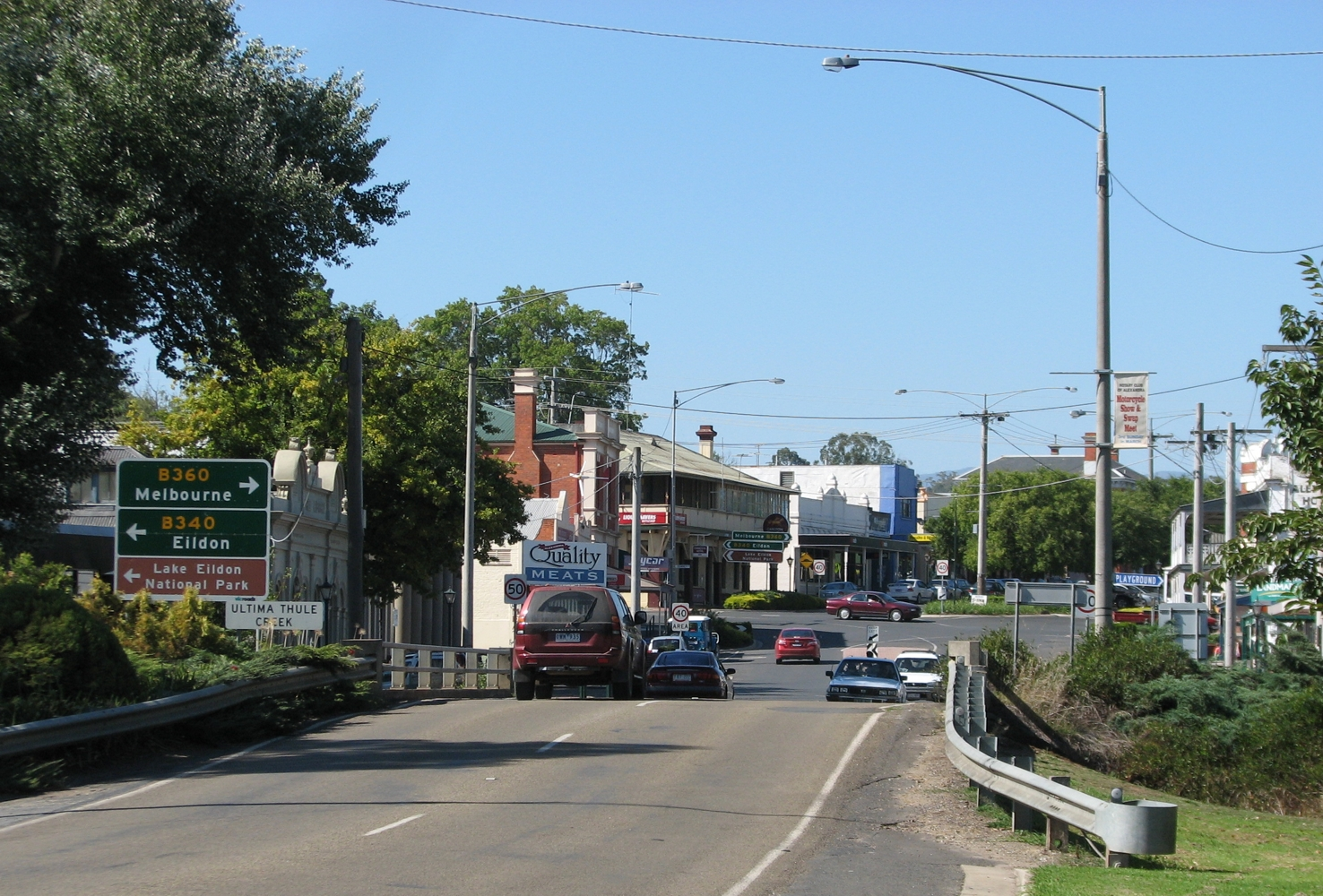
- Grant Street

- Interactive map of Alexandra
- Coordinates: 37°11′30″S 145°42′35″E
- Country: Australia
- State: Victoria
- Region: Hume
- LGA: Shire of Murrindindi
- Location: 138 km (86 mi) from Melbourne; 68 km (42 mi) from Mansfield; 69 km (43 mi) from Seymour

Government
  - State electorate: Eildon
  - Federal division: Indi
- Elevation: 221 m (725 ft)

Population
  - Total: 2,801 (2021 census)
- Postcode: 3714
- Mean max temp: 20.6 °C (69.1 °F)
- Mean min temp: 6.6 °C (43.9 °F)
- Annual rainfall: 714.2 mm (28.12 in)

Alexandra is a town in Victoria, Australia, 130 km (81 mi) north-east of Melbourne. It is located at the junction of the Goulburn Valley Highway (B340) and Maroondah Highway (B360), in the Shire of Murrindindi local government area. At the 2021 census, the town had a population of 2,801 and the broader area (Alexandra District) a population of 6,828.

Gold mining was the catalyst for the development of the town with many mines around Alexandra and particularly along Ultima Thule Creek, known locally as UT Creek, which runs through the town. The town's post office was opened in 1867.

The town has a number of parks. Rotary Park is adjacent to UT Creek and the town's main street and includes toilets, barbecues and the Visitor Information Centre. Leckie Park is a larger, picturesque park of over 11 hectares, also along UT Creek. It includes the Alexandra Bowling Club, a playground and the town's cenotaph.

Lake Eildon is 12 km (7.5 mi) kilometres east of Alexandra and is a major tourist attraction for boating and fishing. The nearby Goulburn River and other local streams such as the Rubicon River also attract many anglers. The Riversdale bridge across the Goulburn is about 2 kilometres west of the town centre. Other popular activities in the area include hunting, four wheel driving, hiking and camping.

Alexandra is the largest town in this part of Victoria and the headquarters of the Shire of Murrindindi as well as State government departments.

== History ==
The original inhabitants of the area were members of two clans of the Taungurung Aboriginal people, the Warring-Illum Balug and the Yowung-Illam Balug.

The town was settled by Europeans in the late 1860s, when it was originally known as Redgate, or Red Gate Diggings. Redgate Post Office opened on the 15th March 1867, and was renamed to Alexandra Post Office on the 24th April 1867. The current name is thought to derive from either Alexandra of Denmark, when the shire was given a statue of her, or from three men named Alexander (Alesander McGregor, Alexander Don, and Alexander Luckie) who discovered gold in the area in 1866. Alexandra has a rich history encompassing gold mining, farming and timber. Industry and commerce has developed along with many other pursuits over a broad spectrum.

Alexandra played a large part in the development of Victoria's high country. Alexandra was home to a number of large timber mills, especially during the mid to late 20th century.

Farming has always been an important component of the local economy. This includes beef and sheep farming. Other important agricultural activities also include wineries, fruit growing, fish production and major commercial lawn growing.

Electricity production from the nearby hydro stations at Rubicon and Eildon have been an important part of the local economy since the 1920s and employed many from Alexandra and district. The Rubicon 'A' switching facility has also been important for power generation in Victoria alongside its workforce. Since the State Electricity Commission was privatised during the 1990s, changes in operations have reduced the local workforce and more automated equipment is being used.

Tourism is fundamental to the Alexandra District and continues to attract many.

The railway to Alexandra arrived as a branch line of the Mansfield railway line in 1909, and closed on 18 November 1978. In 2012, the closed rail line was developed as part of the route for the 134 km long Great Victorian Rail Trail.

The Rubicon Tramway connected Alexandra with the village of Rubicon (locally often known as 'The Tin Hut'), at the junction of the Rubicon and Royston Rivers.

The Alexandra Magistrates' Court closed on 1 January 1990.

=== Bushfires ===
The Black Saturday bushfires that burnt across much of Murrindindi Shire on, and following, 7 February 2009 impacted the area heavily. Alexandra provided support and shelter for many hundreds of people affected by the fires. The fire was managed from the Alexandra Incident Control Centre at the Department of Environment, Land & Planning (DELWP) Offices. Local DELWP and CFA firefighters were heavily involved in controlling the fires over many weeks and the town's service clubs, emergency services, agencies and community volunteers and townspeople provided immediate and long term assistance. Large numbers of firefighting resources, which were brought in to the town, were temporarily housed at a staging area at the Alexandra Showgrounds and at the rear of the Emergency Services Facility in Shamrock Street as well as other locations for many weeks during the firefighting operations.

Alexandra was untouched directly by the fires but was under considerable threat for some time, on occasions, with the fire fronts being only about 9 kilometres away for periods.

Major fires have impacted Alexandra over the years with 1939 and 1969 also being especially disastrous for the area.

== Today ==
Many tourists pass through the town on their way to Mount Buller ski resort from Melbourne and Lake Eildon. Fraser Camping Area bordering Lake Eildon within Lake Eildon National Park attracts many visitors to the area.

To the south of Alexandra, Lake Mountain Alpine Resort, near Marysville, also attracts many day trippers to the mountain, especially during the winter snow.

Cathedral Range State Park, near Taggerty, south of Alexandra is also a popular location for hiking and camping.

The Great Victorian Rail Trail branches to Alexandra and is popular.

The town of Alexandra contains the Timber Tramway and Museum (located at the Alexandra Railway Station), and the National Trust classified post office and law courts. There is a local market on the second Saturday of each month from September to May, an annual art show at Easter, an agricultural show and rose festival in November, and an annual Truck, Ute & Rod Show in June on the Queen's Birthday long weekend.

An annual Christmas Tree Festival is held in December and in July 2015 Alexandra conducted its first Beanie Festival, which is now also an annual event.

== Climate ==
Alexandra's climate is characteristic of central Victoria, with a pronounced 'Mediterranean' rainfall pattern. Summer heat is usually short-lived due to frequent cold fronts and cool changes off the Southern Ocean, evident by its strikingly low minimum temperatures.

Climate data for Alexandra (Post Office, 1910–1970, rainfall 1877–2021); 221 m AMSL; 37.19° S, 145.71° E
Month	Jan	Feb	Mar	Apr	May	Jun	Jul	Aug	Sep	Oct	Nov	Dec	Year
Mean daily maximum °C (°F)	29.3 (84.7)	29.3 (84.7)	26.0 (78.8)	20.5 (68.9)	15.8 (60.4)	12.1 (53.8)	11.7 (53.1)	13.8 (56.8)	17.0 (62.6)	20.3 (68.5)	23.8 (74.8)	27.3 (81.1)	20.6 (69.0)
Mean daily minimum °C (°F)	11.2 (52.2)	11.7 (53.1)	9.4 (48.9)	6.3 (43.3)	4.3 (39.7)	2.9 (37.2)	2.5 (36.5)	3.0 (37.4)	4.4 (39.9)	6.0 (42.8)	8.0 (46.4)	9.9 (49.8)	6.6 (43.9)
Average precipitation mm (inches)	43.2 (1.70)	38.7 (1.52)	48.2 (1.90)	53.1 (2.09)	63.4 (2.50)	69.8 (2.75)	71.6 (2.82)	74.8 (2.94)	68.0 (2.68)	66.7 (2.63)	56.6 (2.23)	60.1 (2.37)	714.2 (28.13)
Average precipitation days (≥ 0.2 mm)	5.4	5.1	6.0	7.9	11.5	13.2	14.8	14.8	12.6	11.1	8.6	7.1	118.1
Source: Australian Bureau of Meteorology; Alexandra (Post Office)

== Radio ==
Local Community Radio station 3UGE (UGFM — Radio Murrindindi) is based in Alexandra. After many years of providing support to the local community during emergencies, UGFM became the first community station in Australia to be given official Emergency Broadcaster status.

UGFM — Radio Murrindindi broadcasts across the Murrindindi Shire from four studios located at Alexandra, Marysville, Kinglake and Yea, and transmitters located at Alexandra & Lake Eildon on 106.9FM, Marysville & Lake Mountain on 98.5FM, Yea & Highlands on 88.9FM and Flowerdale on 98.9FM.

The station has a large listening base throughout the Murrindindi Shire. UGFM was formed during 1993 and commenced broadcasts a year later.

Vision Alexandra 87.6 FM began broadcasting in Alexandra on 24 February 2018. This relay station is operated by Vision Christian Media.

== Education ==
Alexandra is served by Alexandra Primary School, St. Mary's Primary School and Alexandra Secondary College. It is also the site of Alexandra & District Kindergarten.

== Sport and recreation ==
The Alexandra Football Netball Club has competed in the Outer East Football Netball League, Division One from 2019 to 2025. The club previously competed in Waranga North East Football Association from 1927 to 1935, and from 1947 to 1976, before joining the Yarra Ranges Football & Netball League, where they competed from 1977 to 1985 and from 2006 to 2018.

Alexandra has a horse racing club which schedules around four race meetings a year including one on New Years Day and the Alexandra Cup meeting in March.

Golfers play at the Alexandra Golf Club on Gordon Street, or at the course of the Stonelea Country Estate on Connellys Creek Road.

The Alexandra & District Speedway hosts dirt track motor racing throughout the year.

The Alexandra Truck, Ute and Rod show is held here each year in June.

There is a public outdoor swimming pool on Perkins Street that is open during the summer.

At Briggs Oval, opposite the Secondary College, gymnasium and other facilities exist.

== Notable people ==
- Bernhard Smith (1820–1885) – sculptor, painter, police magistrate
- Eric Cumming (1923–1964) – World Professional Sprint Champion
- Ray Weinberg (1926–2018) – Olympic athlete
- Arnold Downer (1895–1984) – civil engineer, construction contractor and company director who founded the Downer Group in 1933
- Dame Pattie Menzies (née Leckie) (1899–1995) – wife of Australia's longest-serving prime minister, Sir Robert Menzies
- John William Leckie (1872–1947) – Australian politician. He served as a Senator for Victoria from 1935 to 1947, having previously been a member of the House of Representatives from 1917 to 1919 and the Victorian Legislative Assembly from 1913 to 1917
- Bridget McKenzie (1969–) – Born in Alexandra, Senator for Victoria, Deputy Leader of the National Party, former Liberal–National Coalition government minister from 2019 until 2022
- Matilda Alice Williams (1875–1973) – Methodist deaconess
- T Jackson (1993–) – State Dart Player for Victoria and Tasmania
- Elizabeth Vivienne Conabere (1929-2009) – botanical artist, writer and conservationist

== See also ==
- List of rail trails
- Local weather observations and other related weather information is available

== Gallery ==
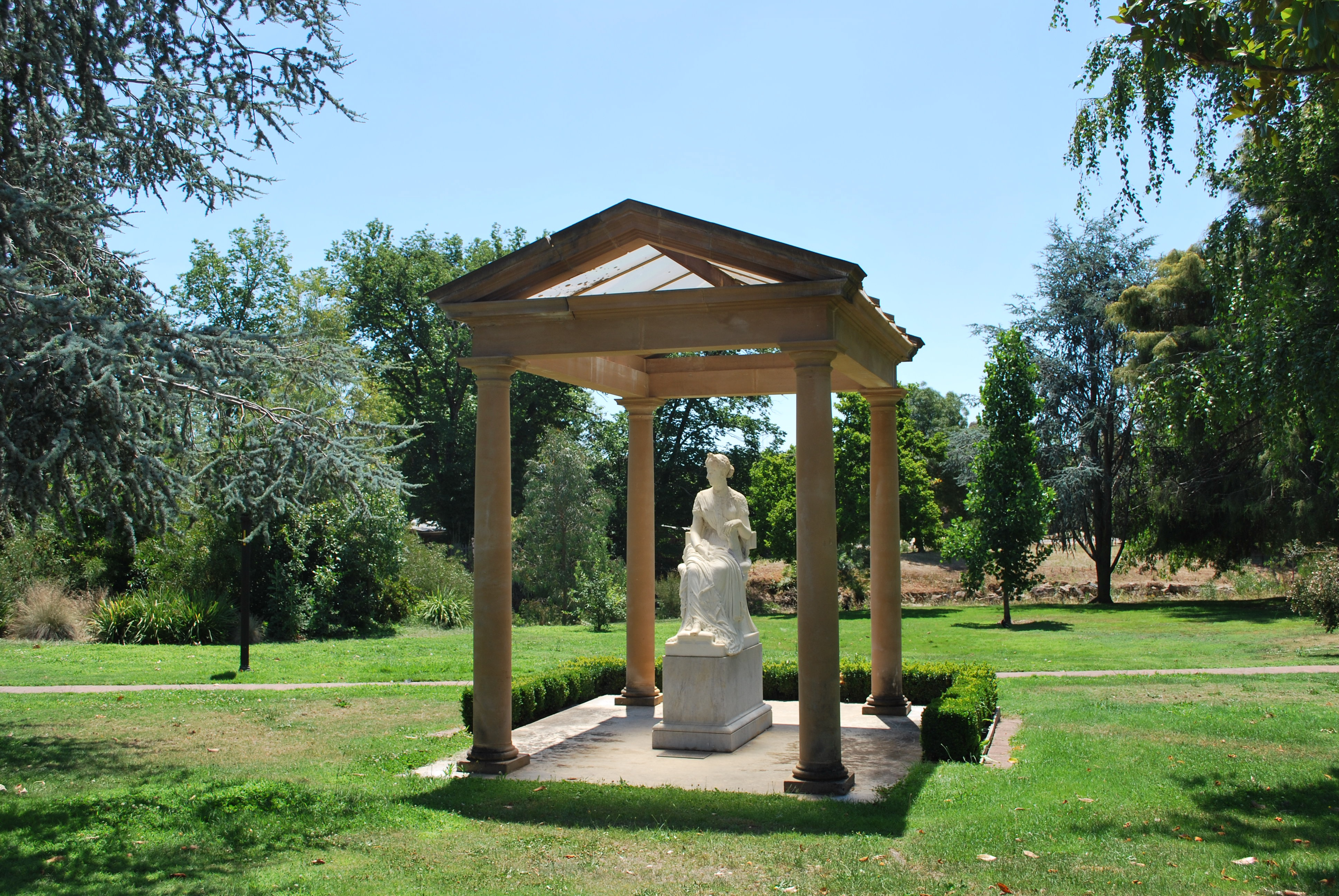
Princess Alexandra

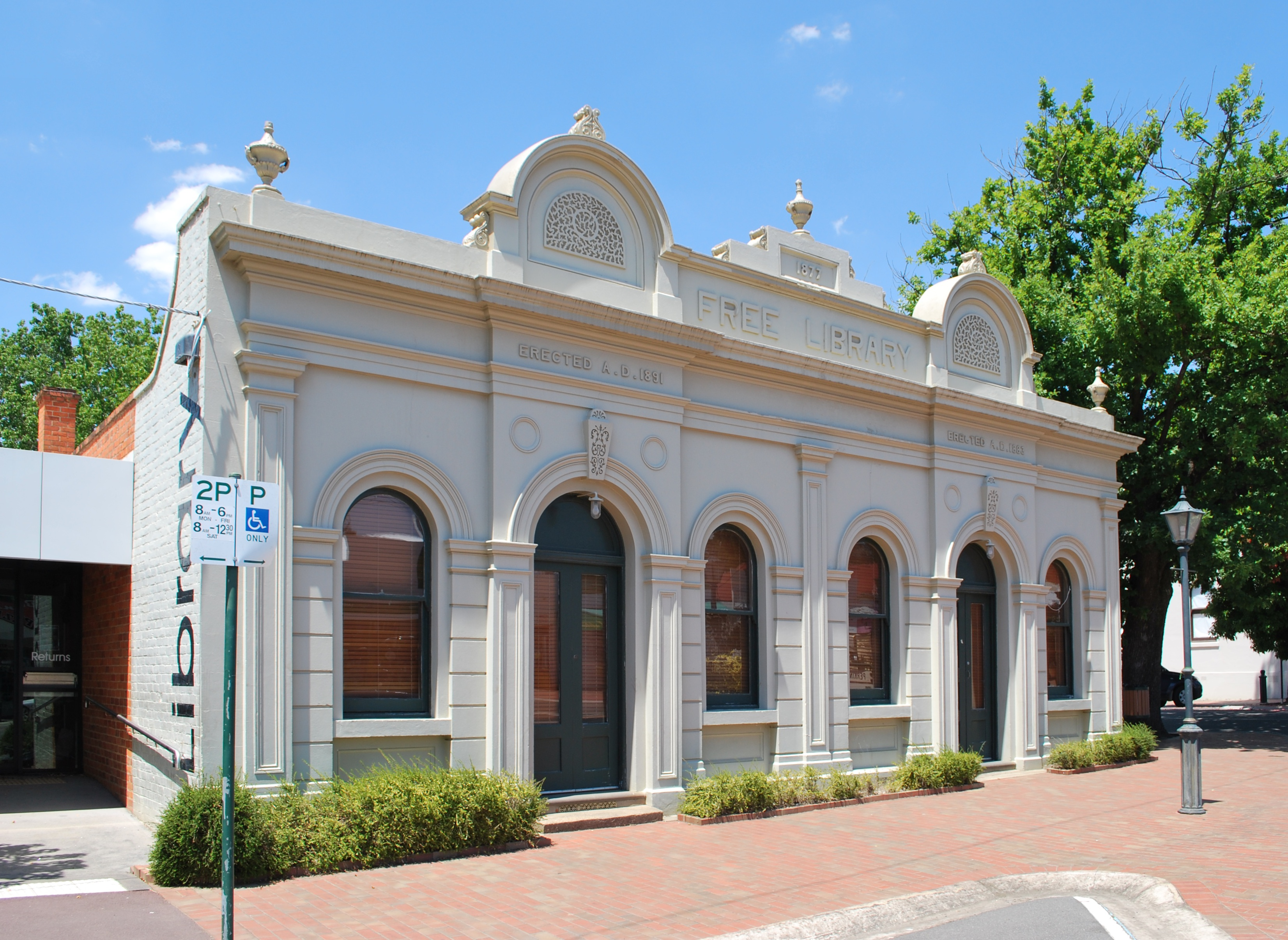
Library

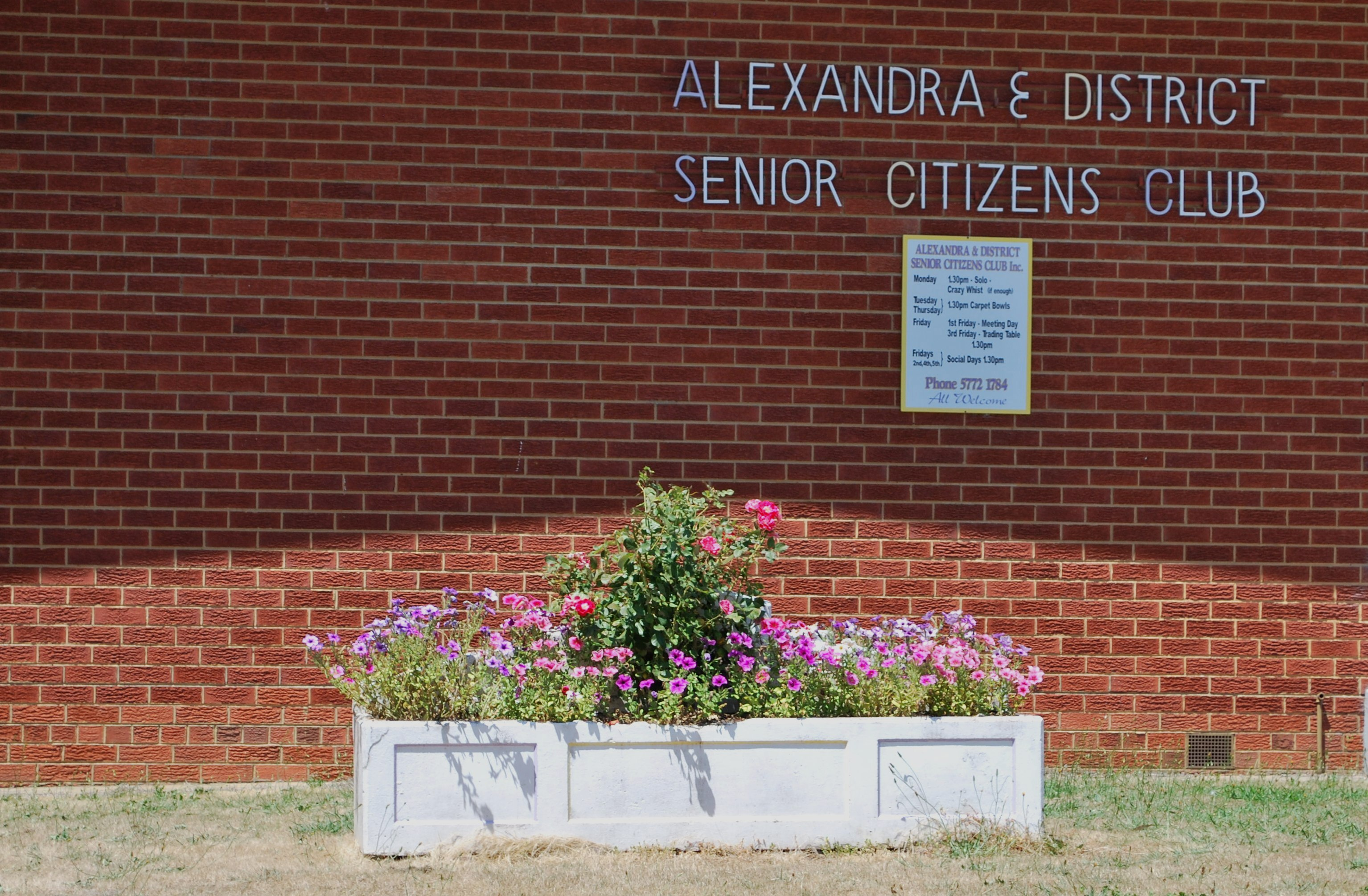
HorseTrough

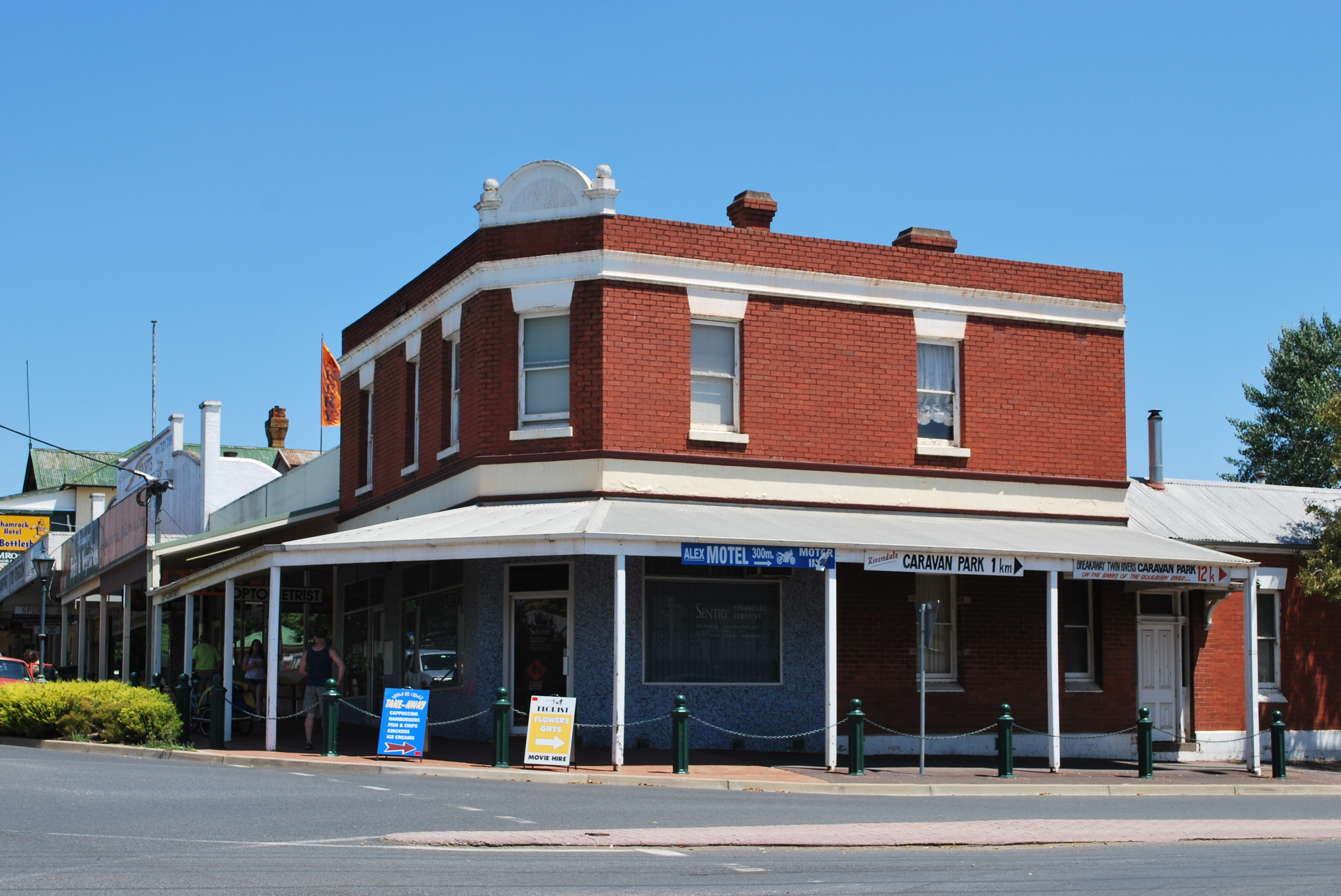

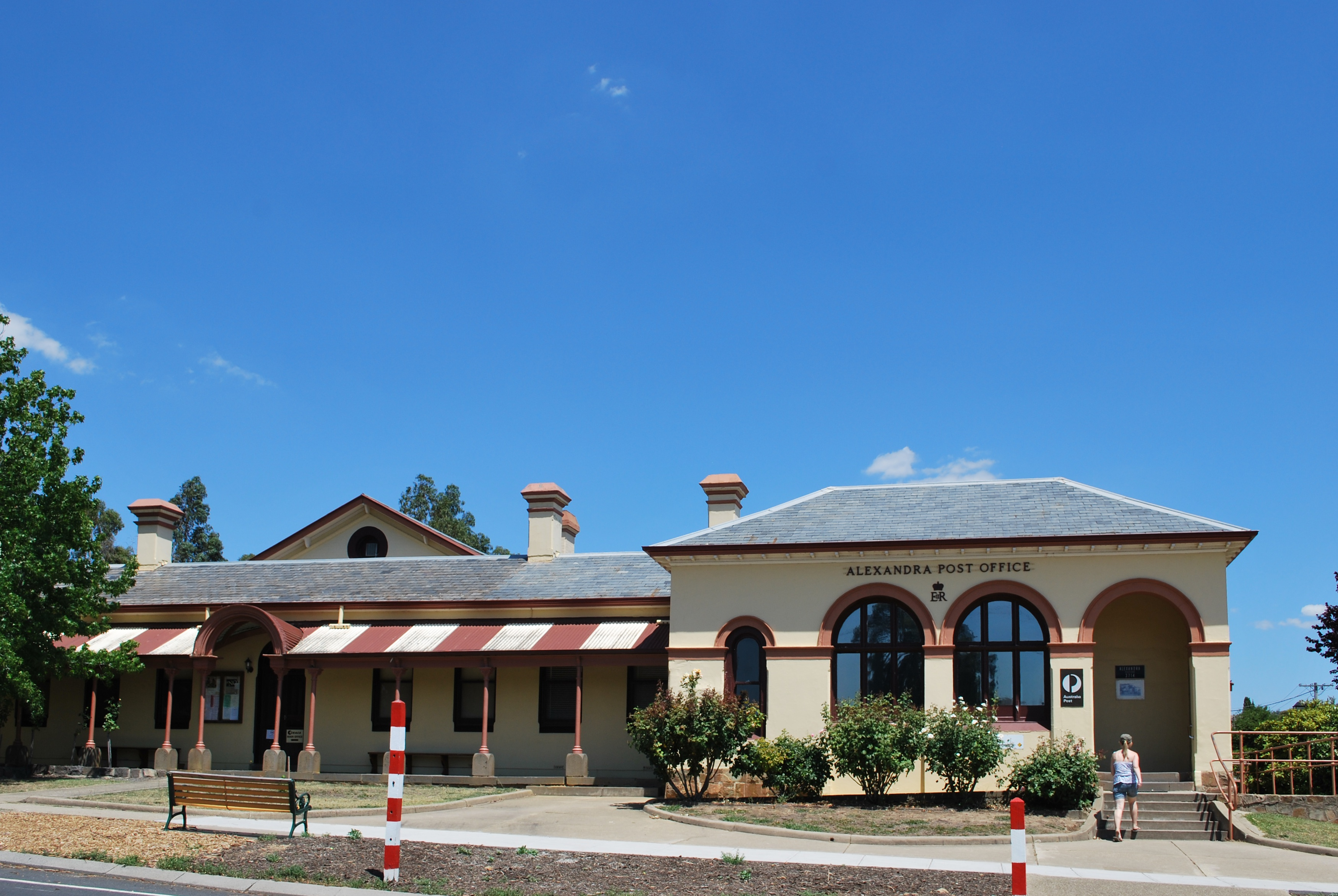
Post Office

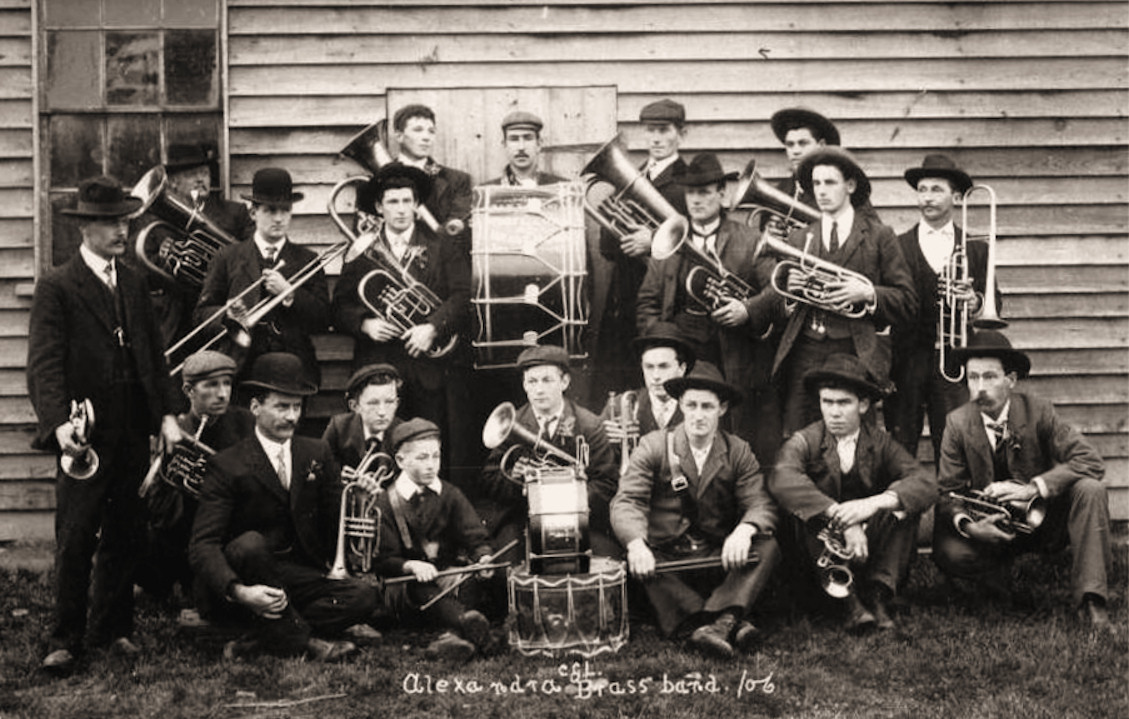
Alexandra Brass Band 1906

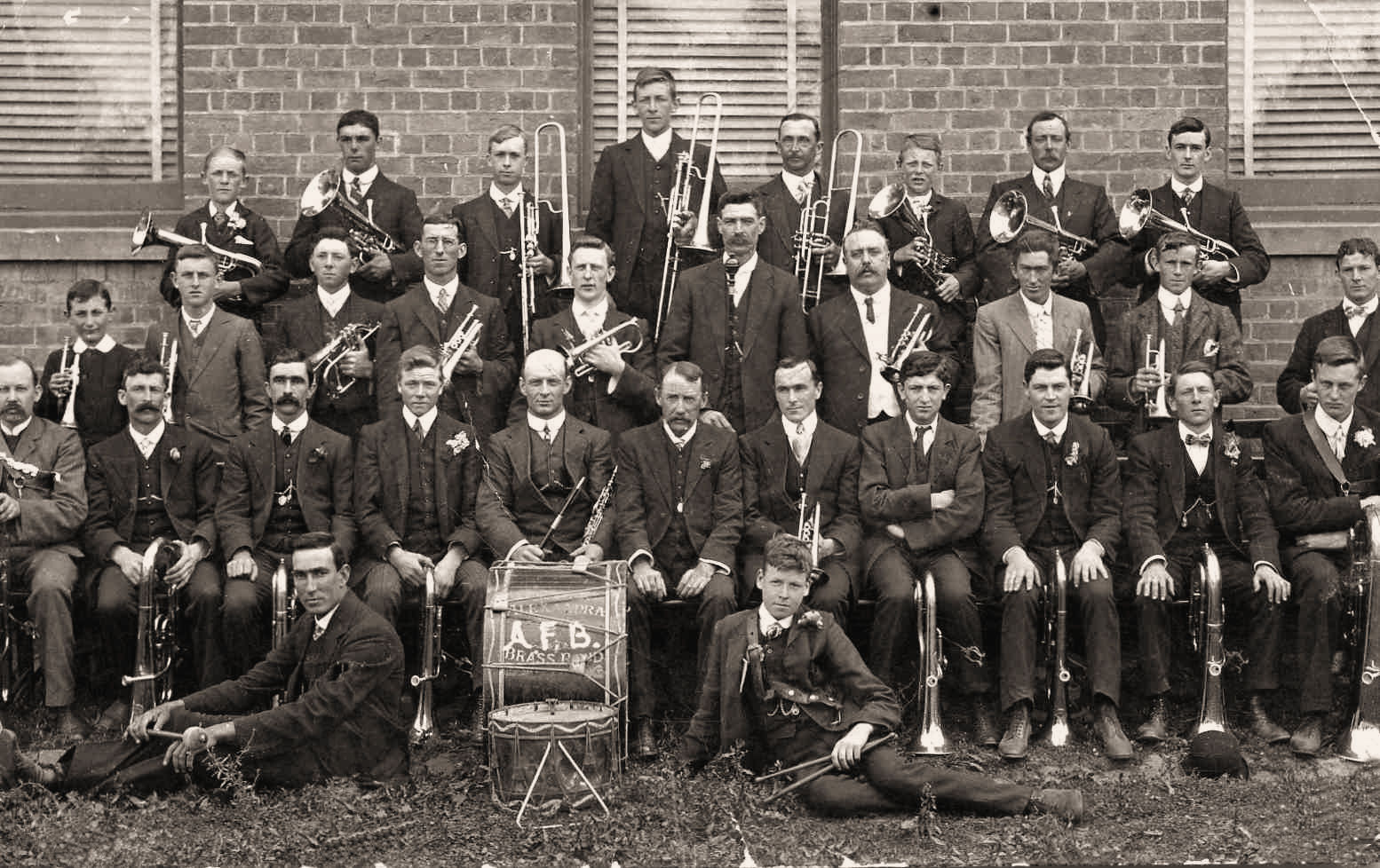
Fire Brigade Band 1912
