= Tallarook =

- Town
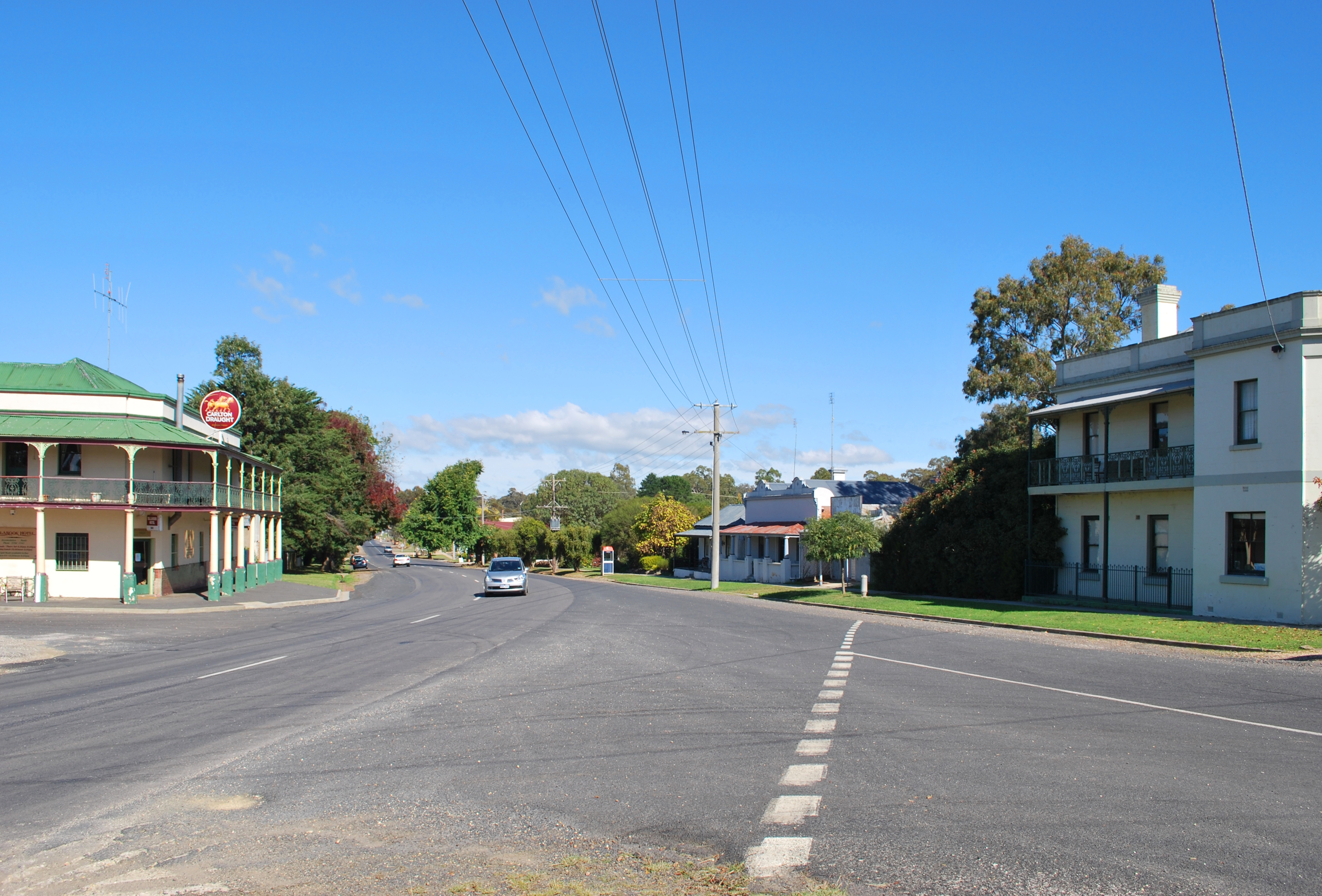
- Main street of Tallarook with the Tallarook Hotel on the left

- Interactive map of Tallarook
- Coordinates: 37°06′0″S 145°06′0″E
- Country: Australia
- State: Victoria
- Region: Hume
- LGA: Shire of Mitchell
- Location: 88 km (55 mi) N of Melbourne; 91 km (57 mi) S of Shepparton; 13 km (8.1 mi) SW of Seymour

Government
  - State electorate: Euroa
  - Federal division: Nicholls

Population
  - Total: 736 (2016 census)
- Postcode: 3659
Localities around Tallarook
Hilldene	Seymour	Whiteheads Creek
Sugarloaf Creek	Tallarook	Whiteheads Creek
Broadford	Broadford	Strath Creek

Tallarook /tæləˈrʊk/ is a town the Shire of Mitchell local government area in central Victoria, Australia. The town is in on the Hume Highway, 88 kilometres (55 mi) north of the state capital, Melbourne. At the 2011 census, Tallarook had a population of 789.

Tallarook Post Office opened on 1 April 1861.

A visitor in 1872 described Tallarook as follows:

Tallarook is by no means a busy or interesting place. It consists of two hotels, two stores, two blacksmiths' forges, a police station, and a number of tumble-down miserable-looking huts of slabs and bark. The inhabitants generally are a very slow class of individuals of the older times, who allow events to come and go without any interference on their part. The Railway Hotel [now the Tallarook Hotel] is a substantial, good brick building, and should the traffic of the Goulburn flow towards Tallarook will be a valuable property, as it is situated nearly opposite the proposed station. The proprietor in the mean time, intends to run a conveyance from his house to Schoolhouse Lane [near Seymour] to meet the up and down trains. [In August 1872 the rail bridge across the Goulburn River to Seymour was completed and the Schoolhouse Lane terminus made redundant].

The town is known in Australia for the colloquialism, "Things are crook in Tallarook", believed to date to the Great Depression and unemployed travellers seeking work. The phrase became the basis of a song composed by Jack O'Hagan—Things Is Crook in Tallarook. It also features in a song written by Garth Porter and Lee Kernaghan, "Tallarook", released on The Outback Club.

The main North East railway opened through the town in 1872 along with the local railway station, and a branch railway to Mansfield was started in 1883, extended to Mansfield in 1891, and Alexandra in 1909, before being closed on 18 November 1978.

Tallarook came to public attention in 1880 with the discovery of a recluse living in the ranges nearby. Dubbed A Wildman at Tallarook, emigrant Henricke Nelsen was arrested and jailed, causing quite a sensation in the region. He is the subject of a 2008 book by Robert Hollingworth. While this book fictionalises Nelsen's life, much of the region's early history is also detailed.

The town is home to a cricket club competing in the Seymour District Cricket Association.

The industrialist Essington Lewis settled near Tallarook on his property, Landscape in his later years until his death in 1961.
