= Kilmore East railway station =

Railway station in Victoria, Australia

Kilmore East
- Kilmore East station in November 2026

General information
- Location: Ogradys Road, Kilmore East, Victoria 3764; Shire of Mitchell; Australia
- Coordinates: 37°17′37″S 144°59′01″E
- System: PTV regional rail station
- Owner: VicTrack
- Operator: V/Line
- Lines: Seymour Shepparton (Tocumwal)
- Distance: 63.49 kilometres from Southern Cross
- Platforms: 2 side
- Tracks: 3
- Connections: Bus

Construction
- Structure type: Ground
- Parking: 116
- Cycle facilities: Yes
- Accessible: Yes

Other information
- Status: Operational, staffed part-time
- Station code: KME
- Fare zone: Myki zone 3/4
- Website: Public Transport Victoria

History
- Opened: 18 April 1872; 154 years ago
- Former names: Kilmore (1872–1888)

Services
Preceding station	V/Line	Following station
Wandong towards Southern Cross	Seymour line	Broadford towards Seymour
Wandong towards Southern Cross	Shepparton line	Broadford towards Shepparton
Track layout
- Standard Gauge track not shown
Location
- Location within Victoria

Kilmore East is a regional railway station operated by V/Line on the Tocumwal, Shepparton and Seymour lines, part of the Victoria rail network. It serves the town of Kilmore East, in Victoria, Australia. Kilmore East is a ground-level part-time staffed station, featuring two side platforms. The station opened on 18 April 1872.

Initially opened as Kilmore, the station was given its current name of Kilmore East on 1 October 1888. The town of Kilmore is some distance to the west, at a much higher elevation, and was unable to be served directly by the main-line railway.

There is a disused goods shed at the station, as well as a staffed signal box. Approximately three kilometres (1.9 mi) in the down direction from the station is a siding which is used to load material from the Apex quarry.

== History ==
The station opened as Kilmore on 18 April 1872, the railway having opened in the same year, as part of the North East line to Wodonga. Located two miles (3.2 km) east of the existing town, the site was surveyed for a new settlement to be called Gavan Duffy, but that did not eventuate. When the branch line from Kilmore Junction to Heathcote opened in 1888, a new Kilmore station was provided closer to the town on the new line, and the original station was renamed Kilmore East.

A timber building was provided on the down platform (Platform 2) in 1878, to replace four temporary structures. A temporary refreshment room operated at the station in 1873, until the one at Seymour was opened. The present station building dates from 1939.

By 1878, a number of sidings for timber loading existed, and interlocking of the signals was provided in 1899. A new lever frame was installed in 1914, when more sidings were added.

In 1962, the Melbourne-Albury standard gauge line opened to the east of the station. In 1969, a crossover and connections to No. 3 and No. 4 roads, all located at the down end of the station, were abolished.

The former locomotive water tank at the station was dismantled on 7 April 1973. In 1979, No. 3 road was booked out of use.

The Apex quarry siding was opened three kilometres (1.9 mi) north of Kilmore East in 1976, but the majority of the other sidings had been removed by the late 1980s.

In 2008, construction began on a seven-kilometre (4.3 mi) long "passing lane" on the parallel standard gauge line, as part of the Australian Rail Track Corporation's Melbourne-Sydney railway upgrade project. The passing lane extends from south of Kilmore East station towards Broadford.

== Platforms and services ==
Kilmore East has two side platforms. It is served by V/Line Seymour and Shepparton line trains.

Kilmore East platform arrangement
Platform	Line	Destination
1	Seymour line Shepparton line	Southern Cross
2	Seymour line Shepparton line	Seymour, Shepparton

== Transport links ==
Mitchell Transit operates one bus route to and from Kilmore East station, under contract to Public Transport Victoria:

- Kilmore Town Service
