= Wandong railway station =

Railway station in Victoria, Australia

Wandong
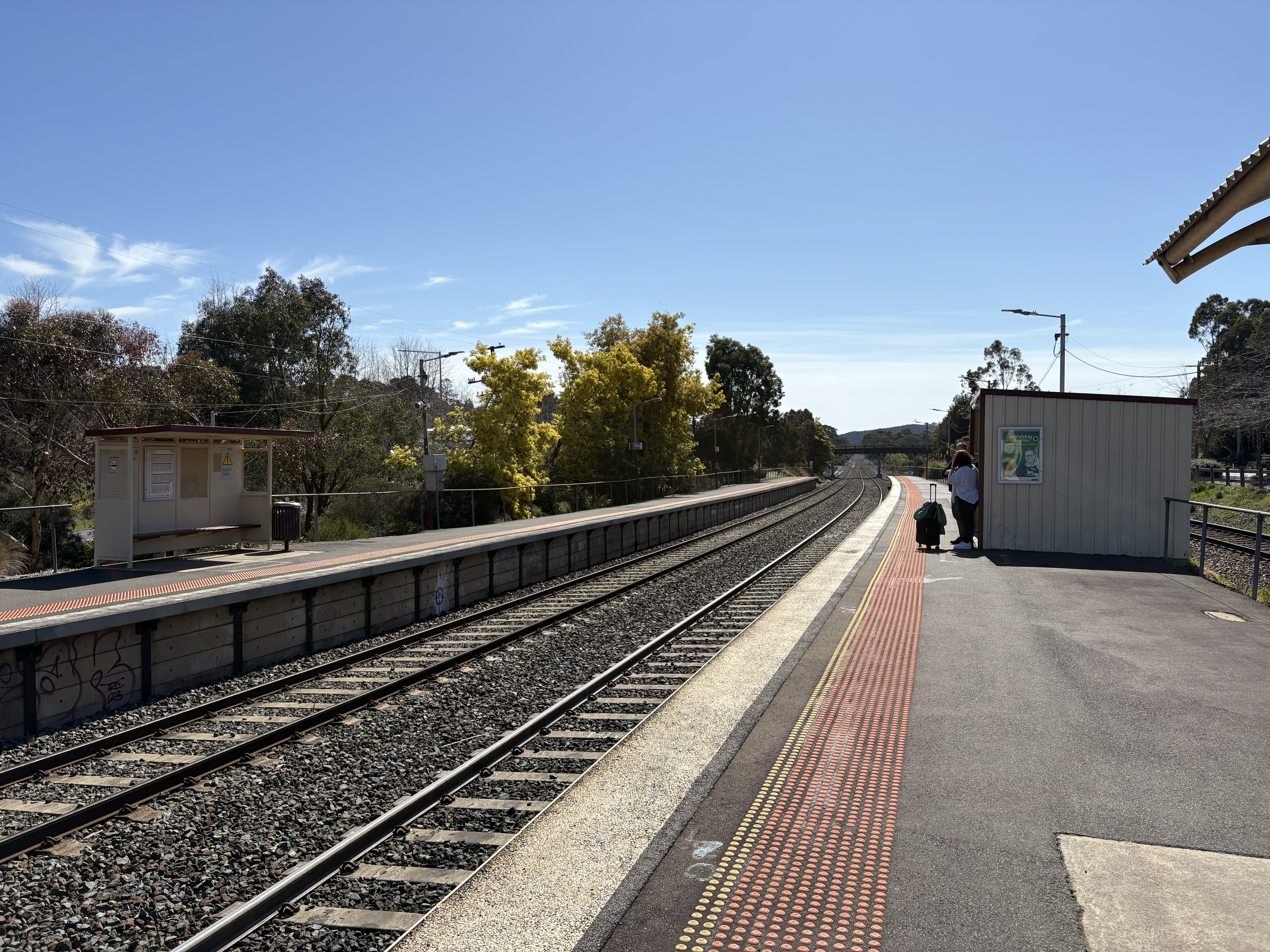
- Northbound view from Platform 1, September 2025

General information
- Location: Epping-Kilmore Road, Wandong, Victoria 3758; Shire of Mitchell; Australia
- Coordinates: 37°21′18″S 145°01′36″E
- System: PTV regional rail station
- Owner: VicTrack
- Operator: V/Line
- Lines: Seymour Shepparton (Tocumwal)
- Distance: 55.29 kilometres from Southern Cross
- Platforms: 2 side
- Tracks: 3

Construction
- Structure type: Ground
- Parking: Yes
- Cycle facilities: Yes
- Accessible: Yes

Other information
- Status: Operational, unstaffed
- Station code: WDG
- Fare zone: Myki zone 2
- Website: Public Transport Victoria

History
- Opened: 11 April 1876; 150 years ago
- Rebuilt: 1990
- Former names: Morphett's

Services
Preceding station	V/Line	Following station
Heathcote Junction towards Southern Cross	Seymour line	Kilmore East towards Seymour
Heathcote Junction Limited service towards Southern Cross	Shepparton line	Kilmore East towards Shepparton
Wallan towards Southern Cross	Shepparton line	Kilmore East towards Shepparton
Location
- Location within Victoria

Wandong railway station is a regional railway station operated by V/Line on the Tocumwal, Shepparton and Seymour lines, part of the Victoria rail network. It serves the town of Wandong, in Victoria, Australia. Wandong is a ground level unstaffed station, featuring two side platforms. The station opened on 11 April 1876, with the current platform shelters provided in 1990.

== History ==
The station opened as a siding named Morphett's, with the North East line to Wodonga having opened in 1872. Soon after that, a short platform was provided alongside the road level crossing, and named Wandong. In 1896, the crossing gatehouse was converted into a station building and signal box and, in 1899, a timber bridge replaced the level crossing. Sidings for timber loading were also provided, and a narrow gauge tramway brought saw timber from nearby sawmills.

A permanent station building was provided in 1900, along with interlocking for the signals and a lever frame. In 1937, a crossover at the down end of the station was abolished.

The present road bridge, located at the down end of the station, dates to 1961, and in the same year, siding "B" was abolished. The following year, in 1962, the Melbourne-Albury standard gauge line opened, operating behind Platform 1.

In 1978, all signals at the station were removed. The station building on the down platform (Platform 2) was removed in 1979, and the current shelters on the platforms were provided in 1990. A weatherboard shelter on the down platform had been removed by August 1991.

Wandong station was damaged in the 2009 Black Saturday bushfires, with repairs required to two bridges, 1,200 railway sleepers, and part of the platform. In August of that year, a new footbridge opened in the up direction from the station. Painted bright blue, the bridge complies with the requirements of the Disability Discrimination Act, but has been criticised as dominating the surrounding landscape.

== Platforms and services ==
Wandong has two side platforms. It is served by V/Line Seymour and Shepparton line trains.

Wandong platform arrangement
Platform	Line	Destination
1	Seymour line Shepparton line	Southern Cross
2	Seymour line Shepparton line	Seymour, Shepparton

== Gallery ==
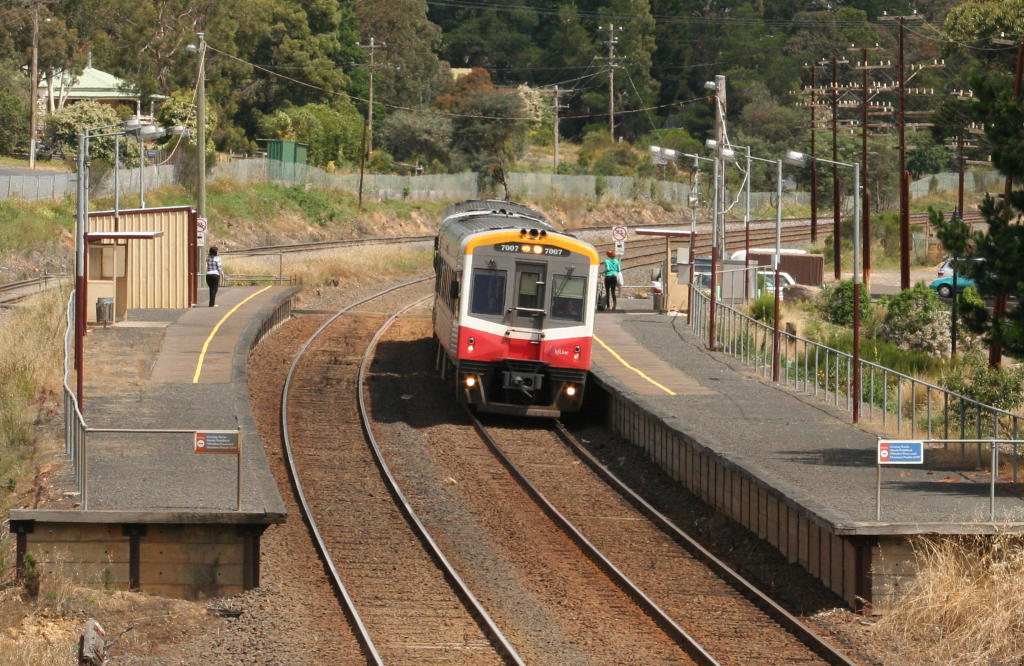
Southbound view with a V/Line Sprinter arriving at Platform 2, December 2008

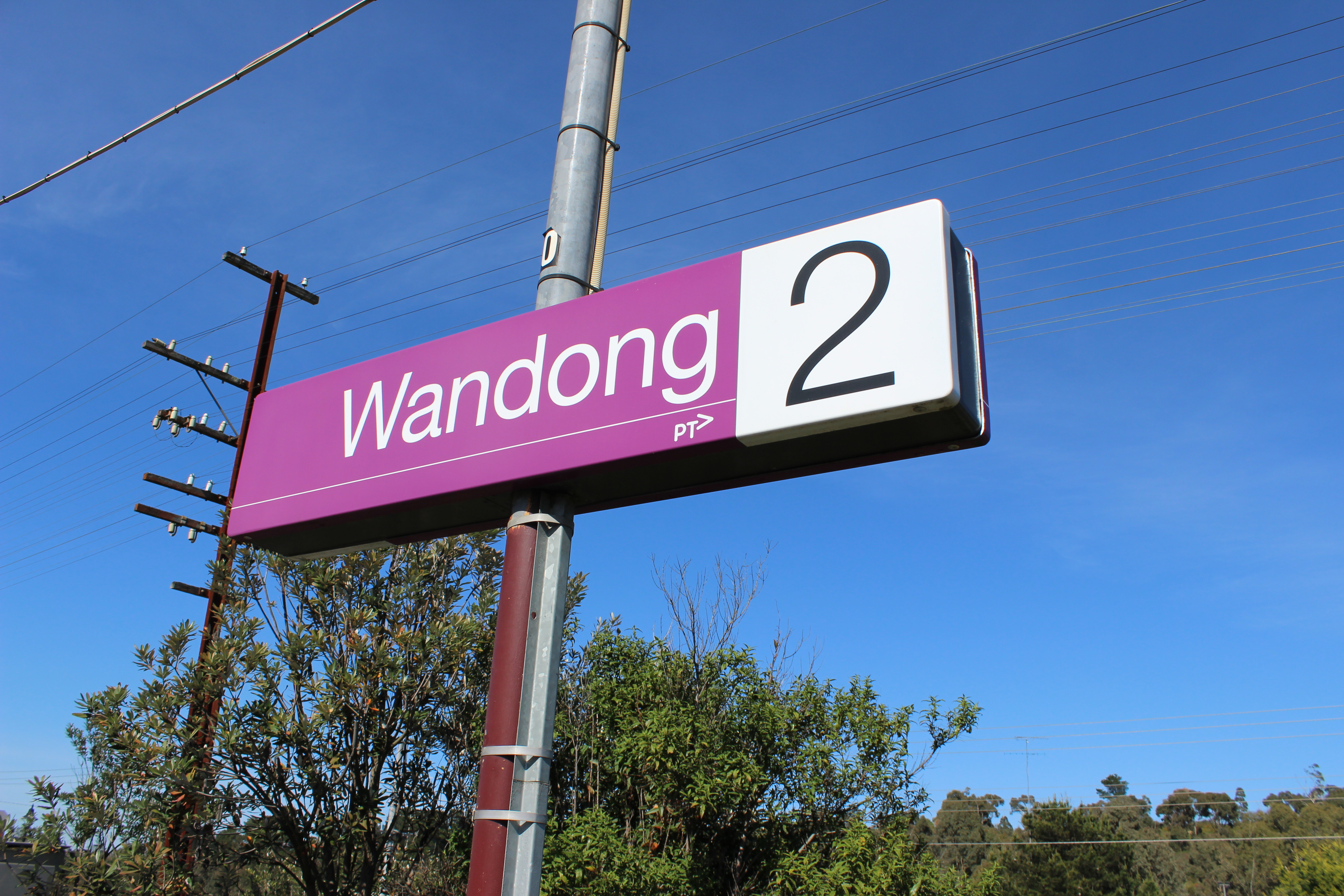
Station platform signage on Platform 2,
October 2017
