= Broadford railway station =

Railway station in Victoria, Australia

Broadford
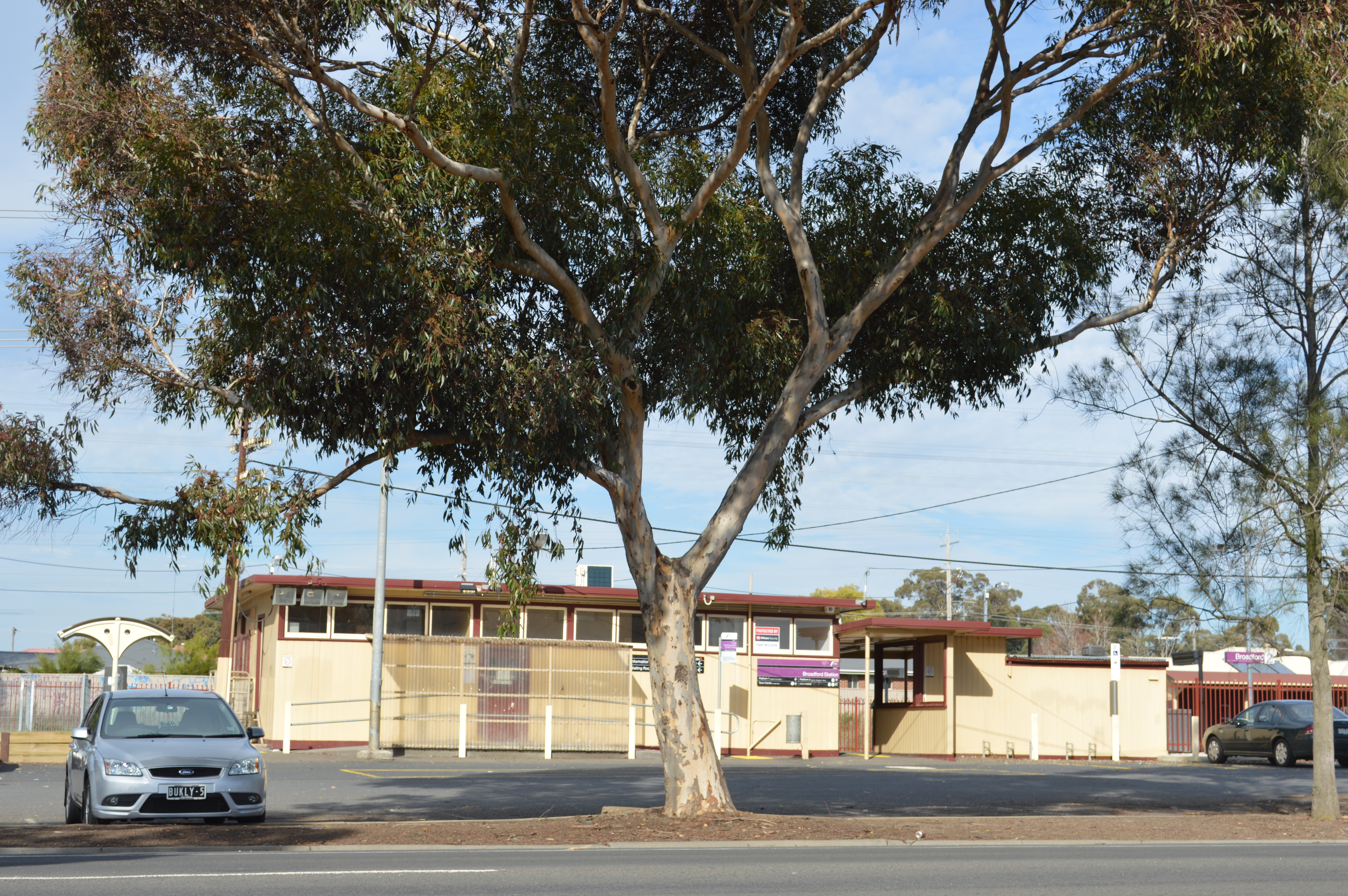
- Station building and entrance to Platform 2, June 2013

General information
- Location: High Street, Broadford, Victoria 3658; Shire of Mitchell; Australia
- Coordinates: 37°12′26″S 145°02′34″E
- System: PTV regional rail station
- Owner: VicTrack
- Operator: V/Line
- Lines: Seymour Shepparton (Tocumwal)
- Distance: 75.17 kilometres from Southern Cross
- Platforms: 2 side
- Tracks: 3

Construction
- Structure type: Ground
- Parking: Yes
- Cycle facilities: Yes
- Accessible: Yes

Other information
- Status: Operational, staffed part-time
- Station code: BRF
- Fare zone: Myki zone 4/5
- Website: Public Transport Victoria

History
- Opened: 18 April 1872; 154 years ago
- Rebuilt: 1960

Services
| Preceding station | V/Line | Following station |
|---|---|---|
| Kilmore East towards Southern Cross | Seymour line | Tallarook towards Seymour |
| Kilmore East towards Southern Cross | Shepparton line | Tallarook Limited service towards Shepparton |
| Kilmore East towards Southern Cross | Shepparton line | Seymour towards Shepparton |
Location
- Location within Victoria

Broadford railway station is a regional railway station operated by V/Line on the Tocumwal, Shepparton and Seymour lines, part of the Victoria rail network. It serves the town of Broadford, in Victoria, Australia. Broadford is a ground level part-time staffed station, featuring two side platforms. The station opened on 18 April 1872, with the current station buildings provided in 1960.

== History ==
Broadford station was opened when the North-East line was opened as far as School House Lane. The duplication of the line was carried out north to Tallarook in 1883, and then south to Wandong in 1886.

The first station building was provided in 1878 and, for many years, the station had two goods sheds, one on each side of the line, along with lengthy platforms for timber traffic. They were removed in 1909, and a cool store was erected.

The present station building dates to 1960, when the station was rebuilt to accommodate the new standard gauge line to Albury. For the same reason, the goods shed, crane and livestock race were relocated to the west side of the main line. The majority of goods sidings had been removed by 1988, along with a number of points leading into the sidings. Another siding was removed in 1989.

Broadford Loop opened on the parallel standard gauge line in 1962, along with the line.

In 2014, a trailing crossover at the up end of the station was booked out of use, and was removed at a later date.

In February 2019, the station was abolished as a double line block post, and the signal box, signals and all associated equipment was removed.

== Platforms and services ==
Broadford has two side platforms. It is served by V/Line Seymour and Shepparton line trains.

Broadford platform arrangement
| Platform | Line | Destination |
|---|---|---|
| 1 | Seymour line Shepparton line | Southern Cross |
| 2 | Seymour line Shepparton line | Seymour, Shepparton |
