= Heathcote Junction railway station =

Railway station in Victoria, Australia

Heathcote Junction
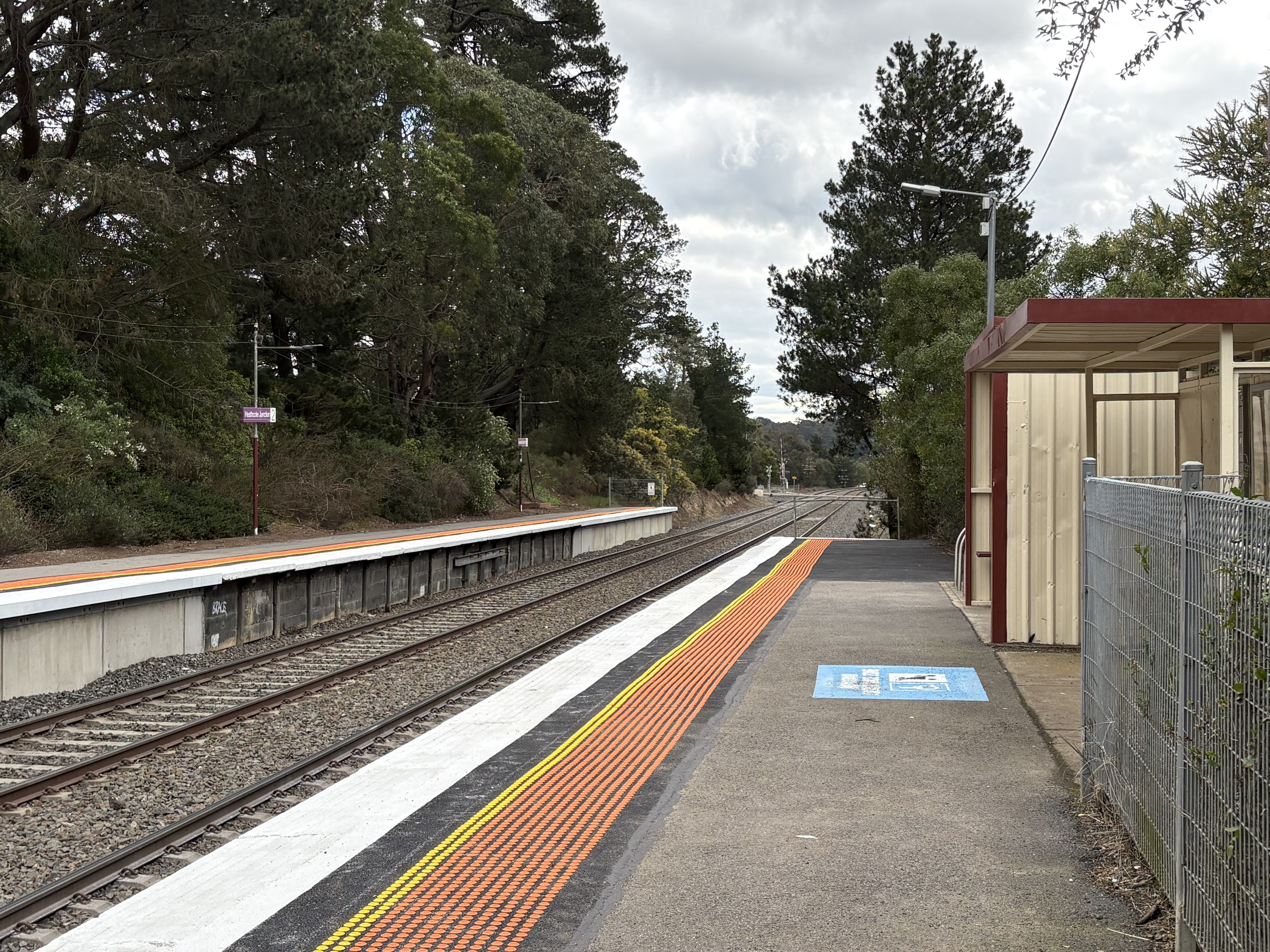
- Northbound view from Platform 2, August 2026

General information
- Location: Epping-Kilmore Road; Heathcote Junction, Victoria; Australia
- Coordinates: 37°22′05″S 145°01′33″E
- System: PTV regional rail station
- Owner: VicTrack
- Operator: V/Line
- Lines: Seymour Shepparton; (Tocumwal)
- Distance: 53.45 kilometres from Southern Cross
- Platforms: 2 side
- Tracks: 3

Construction
- Structure type: Ground
- Cycle facilities: Yes
- Accessible: Yes

Other information
- Status: Operational, unstaffed
- Station code: HCJ
- Fare zone: Myki zone 2
- Website: Public Transport Victoria

History
- Opened: 17 March 1890; 136 years ago
- Rebuilt: 1990
- Former names: Kilmore Junction (1890-1922)

Services
Preceding station	V/Line	Following station
Wallan towards Southern Cross	Seymour line	Wandong towards Seymour
Wallan towards Southern Cross	Shepparton line Limited service	Wandong towards Shepparton
Former services
Preceding station	Disused railways	Following station
Junction	Heathcote line	Towards Kilmore, Heathcote and Bendigo
Location
- Location within Victoria

Heathcote Junction railway station is a regional railway station operated by V/Line on the Tocumwal, Shepparton and Seymour lines, part of the Victoria rail network. It serves the town of Heathcote Junction, in Victoria, Australia. Heathcote Junction is a ground-level unstaffed station, featuring two side platforms. The station opened on 17 March 1890, with the current platform shelters provided in 1990.

Initially opened as Kilmore Junction, the station was given its current name of Heathcote Junction on 15 May 1922.

== History ==
A crossing loop, named Summit, was opened at the location in November 1885, but closed in January 1886, after duplication works on the North East line were completed. Soon afterwards, surveyors planning the route of a branch line to Kilmore, and later to Heathcote, selected the site as the junction of the branch.

In 1887, a junction was provided for construction trains on the new Kilmore line, which branched off to the west of the station, passing behind the down platform, with the points facing Melbourne. In 1888, a signal box, named Kilmore Junction, opened on the eastern side of the main line, but a station was not provided until March 1890. It had only small passenger shelters and no goods facilities. Even though the branch line north-west to Heathcote, and thence to Bendigo, was opened in 1890, the station was not renamed Heathcote Junction until 15 May 1922.

In 1950, flashing light signals were provided at Escrites Road level crossing, located nearby in the down direction from the station. By 1958, the up platform (Platform 1) had been reduced in length, from 376 to 150 feet (115 to 46 m).

In 1962, the Melbourne-Albury standard gauge line opened. It ran behind Platform 1, so the signal box had to be replaced by a new structure to the west of the main lines. It was located at the up end of Platform 2, between the main line and the branch line. The Heathcote branch line closed in 1968, with the signal box following in 1970. It was demolished in February 1973, although the foundations can still be seen.

In 1990, the present station shelters were provided. In 1998, boom barriers were installed at the Escrites Road level crossing.

The pedestrian crossing at the up end of the station was upgraded in 2006-2007.

== Platforms and services ==
Heathcote Junction has two side platforms. It is served by V/Line Seymour line trains and selected Shepparton line trains, with most Shepparton services running express through the station.

Heathcote Junction platform arrangement
Platform	Line	Destination
1	Seymour line Shepparton line	Southern Cross
2	Seymour line Shepparton line	Seymour, Shepparton
