= Wallan railway station =

Railway station in Victoria, Australia

Wallan
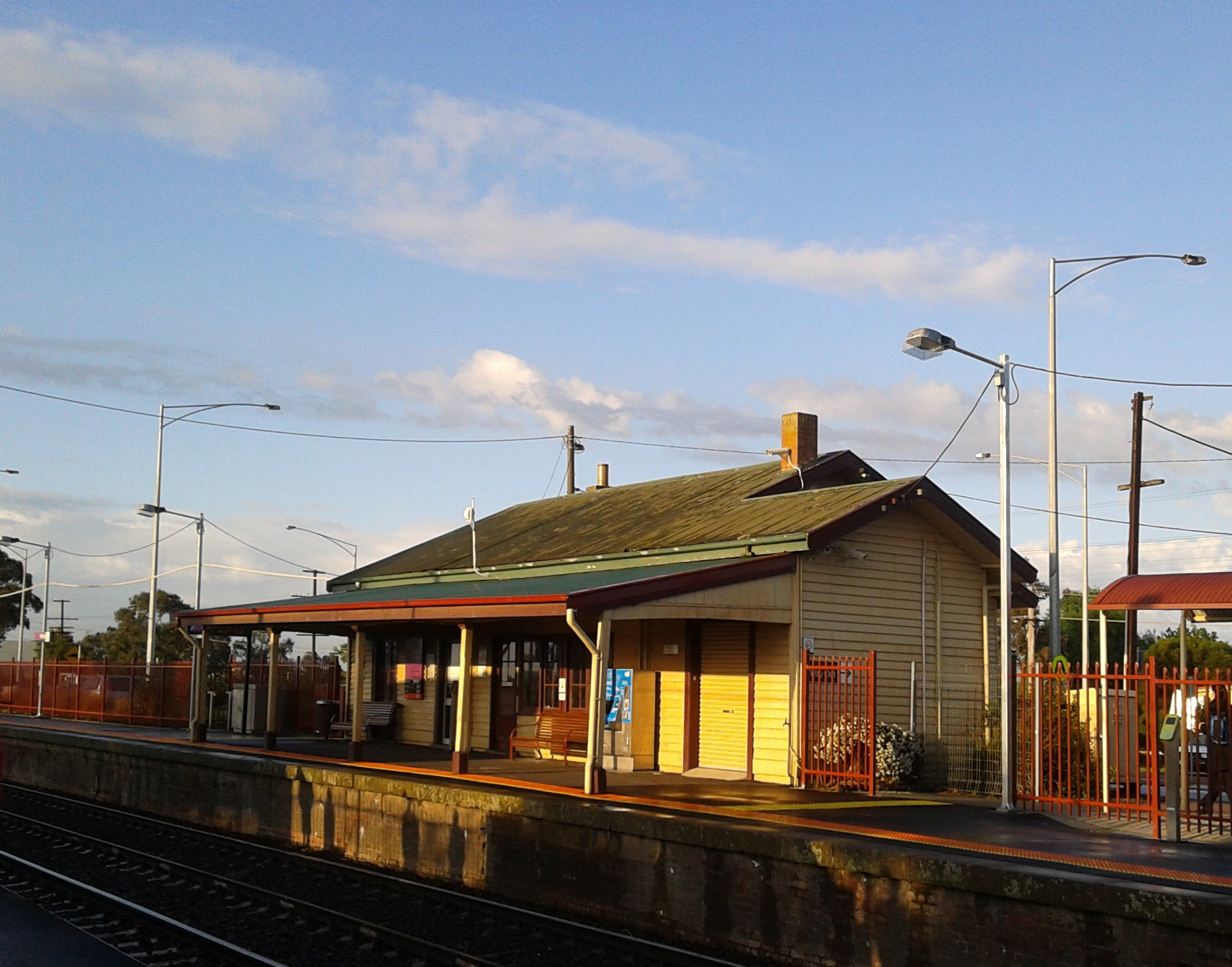
- Station building on Platform 2, November 2012

General information
- Location: Station Street, Wallan, Victoria 3756; Shire of Mitchell; Australia
- Coordinates: 37°25′00″S 145°00′19″E
- System: PTV regional rail station
- Owner: VicTrack
- Operator: V/Line
- Lines: Seymour Shepparton (Tocumwal)
- Distance: 47.49 kilometres from Southern Cross
- Platforms: 2 side
- Tracks: 3
- Connections: Bus

Construction
- Structure type: Ground
- Parking: Yes
- Cycle facilities: Yes
- Accessible: Yes

Other information
- Status: Operational, staffed part-time
- Station code: WAN
- Fare zone: Myki zone 2
- Website: Public Transport Victoria

History
- Opened: 18 April 1872; 154 years ago
- Rebuilt: April 2020

Services
Preceding station	V/Line	Following station
Donnybrook towards Southern Cross	Seymour line	Heathcote Junction towards Seymour
Donnybrook towards Southern Cross	Shepparton line	Heathcote Junction Limited service towards Shepparton
Donnybrook towards Southern Cross	Shepparton line	Wandong towards Shepparton
Location
- Location within Victoria

Wallan railway station is a regional railway station operated by V/Line on the Tocumwal, Shepparton and Seymour lines, part of the Victoria rail network. It serves the town of Wallan, in Victoria, Australia. Wallan is a ground-level part-time staffed station, featuring two side platforms. The station opened on 18 April 1872, with the current station provided in April 2020 by the Regional Rail Revival Project.

== History ==
The station opened as Wallan Wallan, a few months after the North East line to Wodonga opened. The main town on the Hume Highway has since become known as Wallan, while the township beside the railway has become known as Wallan East.

The first goods shed was provided in 1873, with a loading platform for timber erected the following year. In 1876, the goods shed was replaced, and the current wooden building on the down platform (Platform 2) provided. The first lever frame was provided in 1895, with a separate signal box on the up platform (Platform 1) coming into use in 1916.

Wallan was provided with a number of sidings to marshal trains for the Heathcote line, which branched off the North East line at Heathcote Junction. A small locomotive depot was also provided, along with a 50 feet (15 m) long turntable in 1892. Due to increasing timber traffic on the Heathcote line, the yard was substantially expanded in 1913, including sidings worked by gravity. In 1933, an additional 70 feet (21 m) turntable was provided.

In 1962, the Melbourne–Albury standard gauge line was opened, running behind Platform 1, with a passing loop provided to the east of Wallan station. The loop was extended by 650 metres, from 900m to 1500m, in 2000. Also in 1962, boom barriers were provided at the Wallan Road level crossing, located nearby in the up direction from the station.

Between 1961 and 1965, the locomotive servicing facilities were removed, and the late 1980s and early 1990s saw the removal of the remaining sidings. Further removal of a number of points and signals was undertaken in April 1991. Also around that time, a crossover was provided at the down end of the station. The signal box was removed in 1995, and replaced by a lever frame in the station building. The frame was built from parts of the Craigieburn frame, and was the last frame to be installed on a mainline railway in Victoria.

In August 2018, plans for a station upgrade were announced, as part of the Regional Rail Revival project. Works included the provision of more car parking spaces, an upgraded bus interchange, extra platform shelters, and a lengthening of the Melbourne-bound platform at the up end, to accommodate six-carriage trains. The upgrades to the bus interchange and the car park had been completed by November 2019, with the remaining works completed by early 2020.

Beveridge station, now demolished, was located between Wallan and Donnybrook stations.

== Platforms and services ==
Wallan has two side platforms. It is served by V/Line Seymour and Shepparton line trains.

Wallan platform arrangement
Platform	Line	Destination
1	Seymour line Shepparton line	Southern Cross
2	Seymour line Shepparton line	Seymour, Shepparton

== Transport links ==
Mitchell Transit operates five routes to and from Wallan station, under contract to Public Transport Victoria:

- 1 : to Wallan Central
- 2 : to Springridge
- 3 : to Wallara Waters
- Link Bus A : to Springridge
- Link Bus B : to Wallara Waters

== See also ==
- 2020 Wallan derailment
