= Seymour line (disambiguation) =

Seymour line is a regional passenger rail service operated by V/Line in Victoria, Australia.

Seymour line may also refer to:

- Tocumwal railway line in Victoria, Australia, also known as the Shepparton railway line
- North East railway line in Victoria, Australia, also known as the North East / Albury railway line
