= V/Line Sprinter =

High speed diesel railcar train used in Victoria, Australia

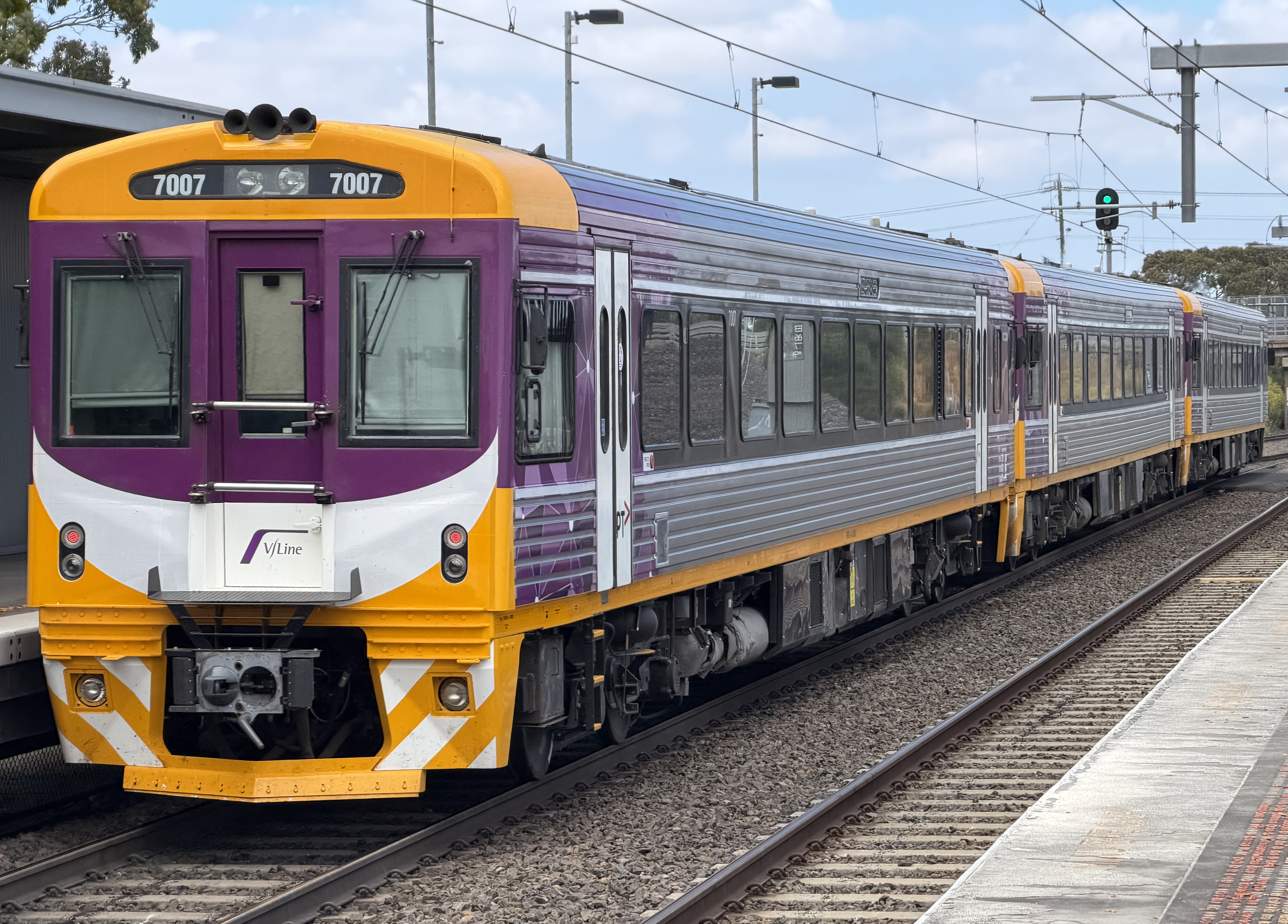
- Refurbished car 7007 at Coolaroo railway station, January 2026

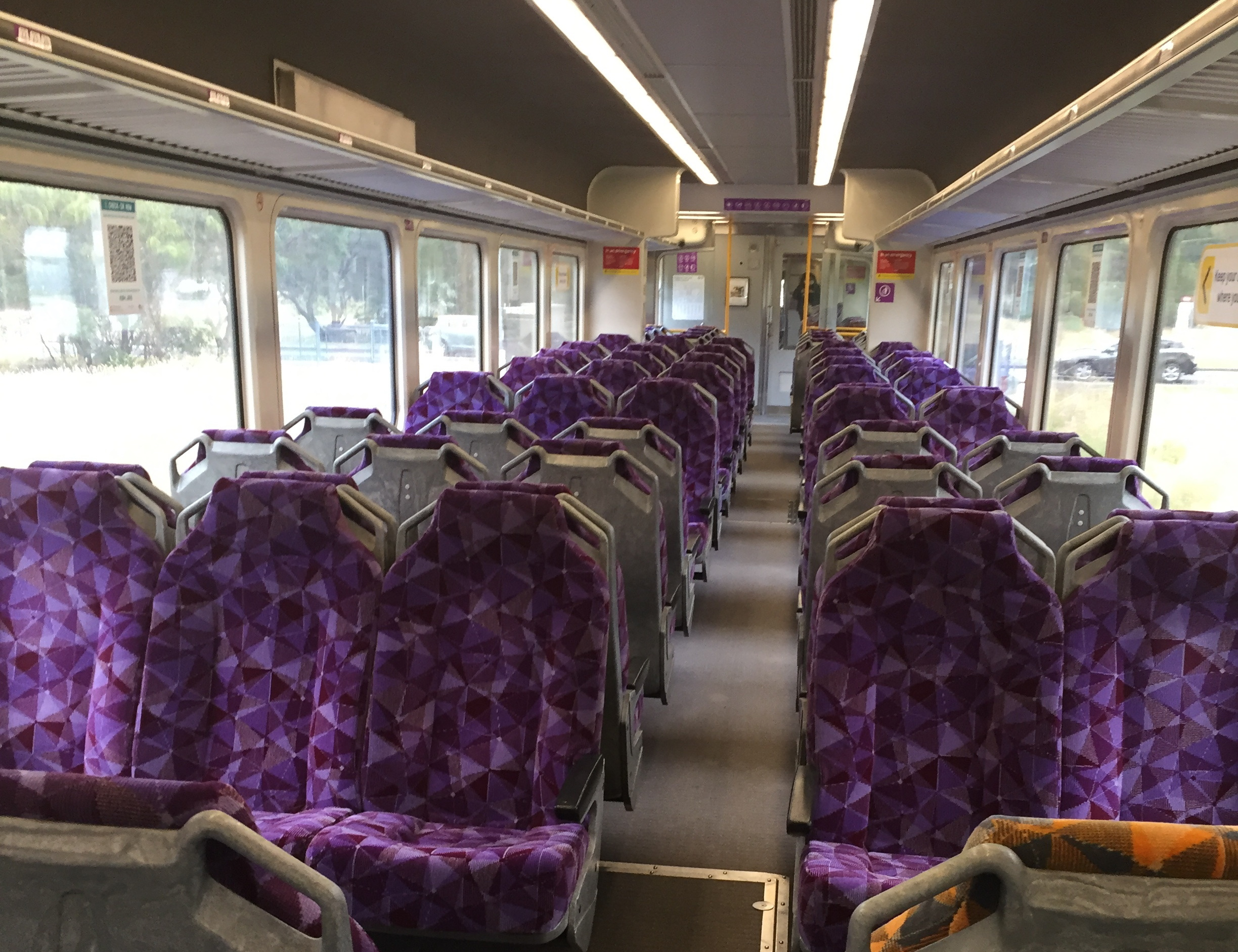
- Refurbished interior, December 2021
- Manufacturer: A Goninan & Co
- Built at: Broadmeadow
- Constructed: 1993–1995
- Entered service: December 1993
- Number built: 22
- Number in service: 21
- Number scrapped: 1: (7019) accident damage
- Fleet numbers: 7001–7022
- Capacity: 88 fixed seats, 2 folding seats, 1 wheelchair position, 15 standees, 2.1 m^{2} (23 ft^{2}) for luggage
- Operators: V/Line, Metro Trains Melbourne
- Depot: Southern Cross
- Lines served: V/Line: Seymour; Metro Trains Melbourne: Stony Point

Specifications
- Car body construction: 25.0 m (82 ft 0 in)
- Car length: 25.9 m (85 ft 0 in)
- Width: 2.94 m (9 ft 8 in)
- Height: 3.905 m (12 ft 9.7 in)
- Floor height: 1.3 m (4 ft 3 in)
- Doors: 4 plug doors made by IFE, clear doorway openeing 800mm
- Wheel diameter: New wheels 145 km/h (90 mph) or worn wheels 135 km/h (84 mph)
- Wheelbase: bogie pivot centres 16.6 m (54 ft 6 in)
- Maximum speed: 130 km/h (81 mph) in service Balance speed level track 100 km/h (62 mph) (1 engine) or 140 km/h (87 mph) (2 engines) Balance speed 1:50 slope 45 km/h (28 mph) (1 engine) or 85 km/h (53 mph) (2 engines)
- Weight: 50 t (49 long tons; 55 short tons) empty, 58 t (57 long tons; 64 short tons) crush loaded, 6.2 t (6.1 long tons; 6.8 short tons) per bogie
- Prime movers: 2 × Deutz KHD BF8L513C four-stroke, with exhaust turbo charging and charged air cooling
- Cylinder count: 8 cylinders at 90 degree vee, capacity 12.7L
- Power output: 2x 235 kW (315 hp) at 2300rpm = 470 kW (630 hp). Idle 750rpm, high idle 1200rpm, 8 notches, Heinzmann electronic control
- Tractive effort: maximum 27 kN (6,100 lb_{f}) per engine.
- Transmission: Voith T211RZ hydraulic
- Gear ratio: 1:2.723
- Deceleration: minimum 0.73 m/s/s service, 0.83 m/s/s emergency
- Auxiliaries: Battery 24V 252Ah for 5 hours, charger Zener I/O 415V/24V. Auxiliary alternator Hitzinger Synchronous, variable speed shaft drive, 34 kW (46 hp) Auxiliary inverter/rectifier Elin RE1-2304, cooling capacity 28 kW (38 hp)
- UIC classification: B'B'
- AAR wheel arrangement: 920 mm (3 ft 0 in) new / 870 mm (2 ft 10 in) worn
- Minimum turning radius: 100 m (328 ft 1 in)
- Braking system: Davies and Metcalfe EBC/5 EP pneumatic disc
- Safety systems: PA system Stone McColl, data logger Fischer
- Coupling system: Scharfenberg coupler
- Track gauge: 1,600 mm (5 ft 3 in) broad gauge

Notes/references
- Fuel consumption 0.25L/min idle, 1.1L/min full power, nominal 08.L/km 1 engine or 1.0L/min 2 engines. Fuel tank 1,100L, water tank 150L Windscreen 22 mm (0.87 in) thick Design end load 1,000 kN (220,000 lb_{f}); Design collision load 540 kN (120,000 lb_{f}) Service intervals 50,000 km, major overhaul intervals 500,000km.

The V/Line Sprinters are diesel railcars which are operated by V/Line on its Seymour line service with some also leased to Metro Trains Melbourne for its Stony Point line commuter service. They were built between 1993 and 1995 by A Goninan & Co in Broadmeadow, New South Wales.

== Design origins ==
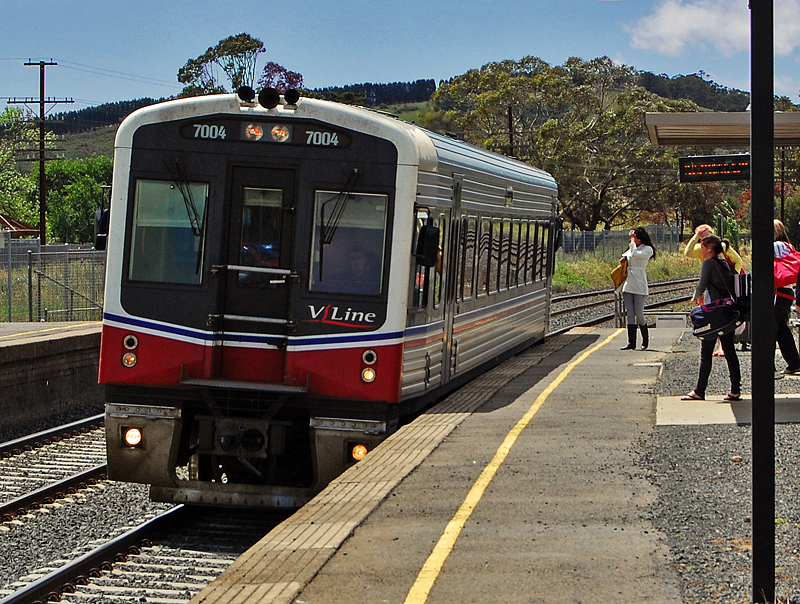
7004 at Wallan in November 2007 in V/Line Mark II livery

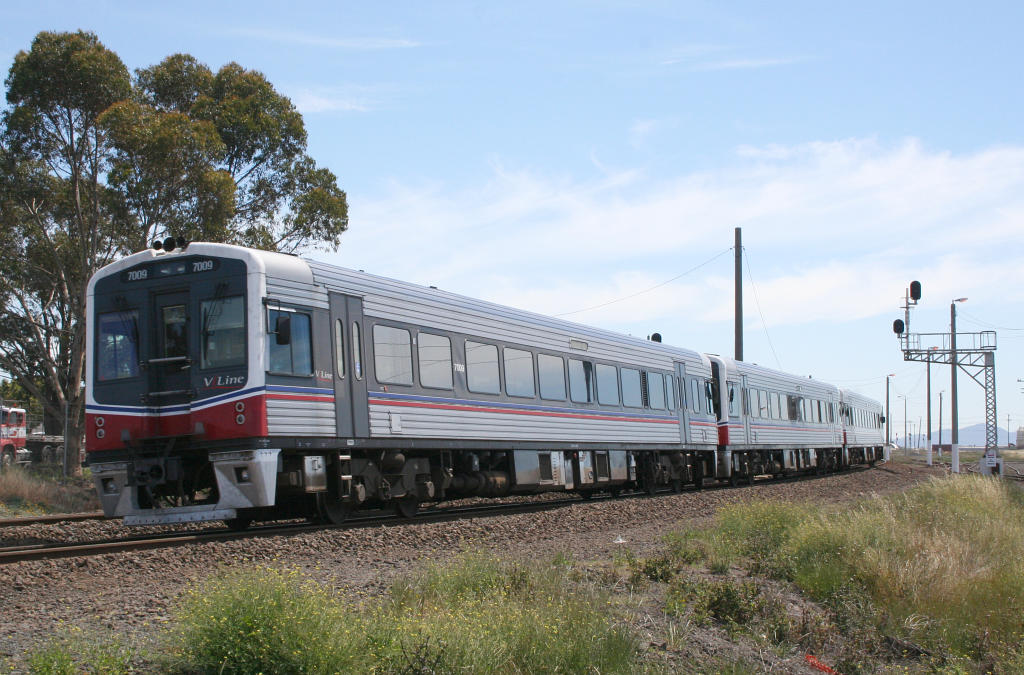
Three Sprinters in Geelong in November 2007 in V/Line Mark II livery

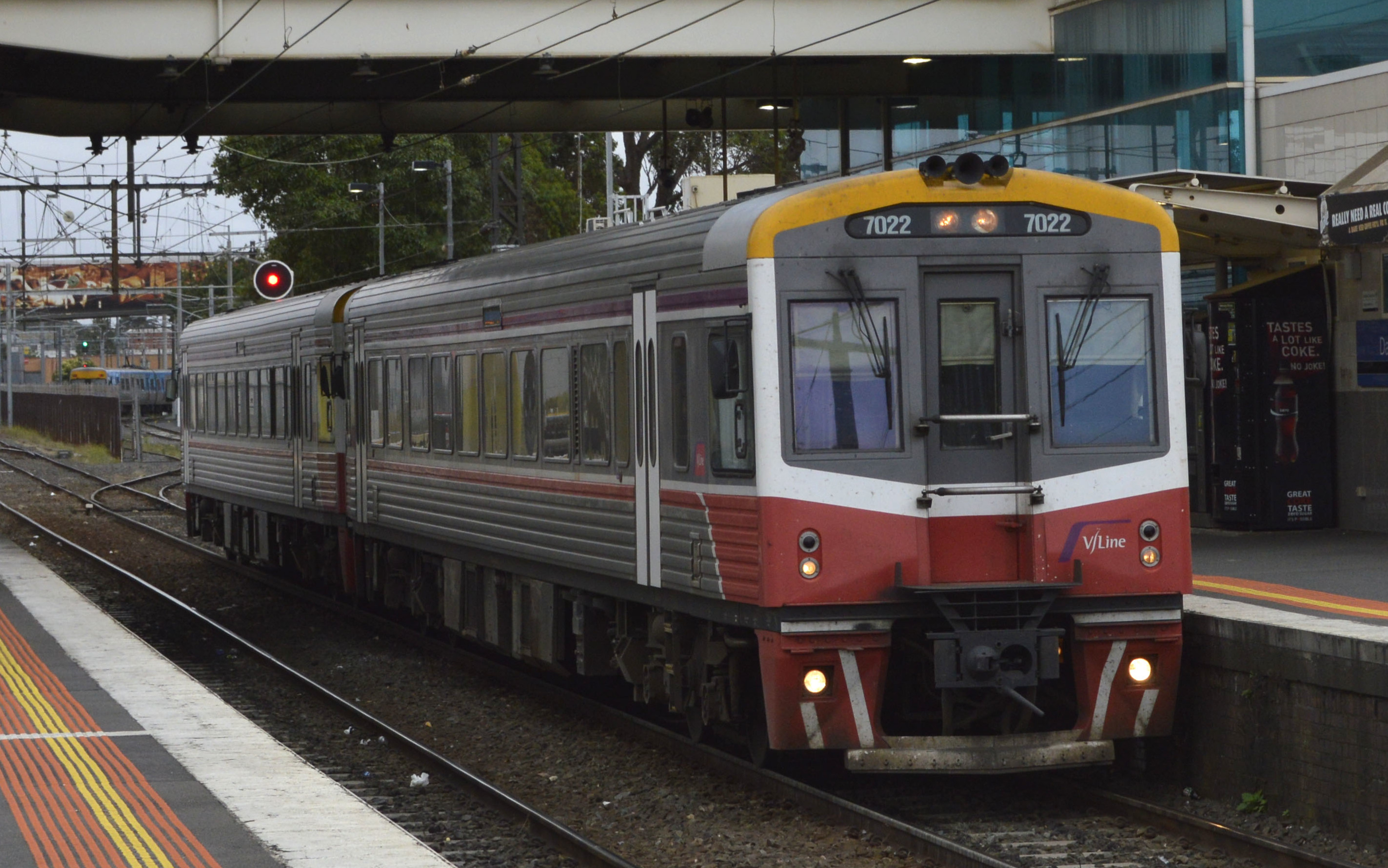
A refurbished two car set at Dandenong, 2013

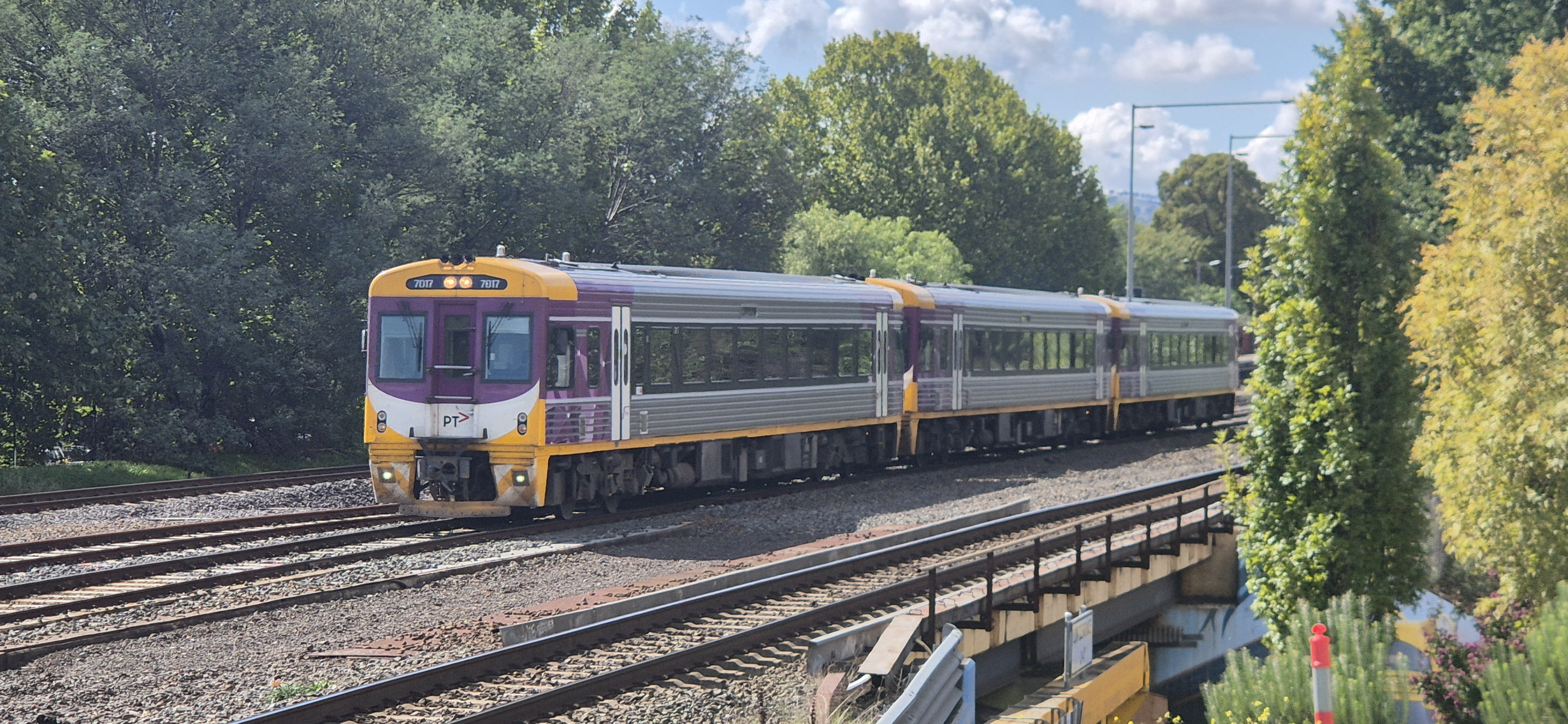
3 Refurbished V/Line Sprinters Depart Seymour on a Southern Cross Service

The Sprinter concept dates back to 1989, when the Public Transport Corporation, having seen a substantial increase in patronage and reduction in costs following the introduction of faster, more frequent services as part of the New Deal for Country Passengers program of the 1980s, required additional train capacity to meet demand. Initial talks suggested an order for 24 new vehicles, though the tenders for the construction of the 22 railcars closed in November 1989.

At the time, they were designed to supplement locomotive-hauled H type carriage sets on shorter runs (such as on the outer suburban services to Melton and Sunbury, as well as the interurban Geelong and Seymour services) and thus provide faster and more frequent service to Melbourne's fringe areas, and indirectly (primarily by freeing up other rollingstock) to more distant regions. Their introduction also enabled the retirement of the four DRC railcars from service.

In keeping with their intended operation, they feature high-capacity single-class seating and a single-car railmotor design over a multiple unit design, allowing a large number of passengers to be carried with greatly reduced operating costs and increased flexibility.

== Manufacturing and testing ==
On 11 October 1991, the federal government announced the purchase of 22 Sprinters, built at a total cost of $65 million, of which the Federal Government provided $24 million through its Better Cities program.

Twenty-two single-car semi-monocoque stainless-steel-body (30IL) railcars were ordered from A Goninan & Co, Broadmeadow, for introduction to service between 1993 and 1995. Construction commenced in March 1993 with the final unit outshopped in January 1995. The first two units were fully fitted out at Goninan, with the other 20 units internally fitted out at the PTC North Bendigo workshops. All were transferred to Melbourne by rail on standard gauge transfer bogies.

== Passenger experience ==
Sprinters feature a mix of 3x2 and 2x2 economy seats arranged so that half of them face the direction of travel at any one time. Reflecting the nature of the sets and their intended use, these seats are slightly smaller than the seats found in H and N sets and VLocity DMUs. They are finished in blue patterned cloth.

The cars are also fitted with a toilet and drinking fountains. Provision is made at one end of each carriage for one wheelchair and occupant. When this space is not needed able-bodied passengers may make use of the three wall-mounted fold-down seats. The toilet has a wide door and grab bars for use by disabled passengers.

Passenger luggage can be carried in the overhead racks, between the backs of seats, or in the luggage/bicycle storage area usually found at the Melbourne end of the carriage. Ordinary access to the car is via four automatic plug doors, one on each side of the car at each end. These doors are opened by a push button mounted beside them and closed by the driver, and are wide enough to permit the access of a standard wheelchair.

== Technical ==
Each car is powered by two air-cooled Deutz turbocharged V8 diesel engines. Power is transferred via a Voith T211RZ hydraulic transmission. Sprinters use a Davies and Metcalfe EBC/5 EP anti-slide pneumatic disc brake system.

To facilitate use in multiple-unit formations, they are fitted with Scharfenberg couplers. This allows them to be coupled to other Sprinters to form a train as long as eight carriages.

Their fuel capacity provides a range of 1,000 km (620 mi).

== Service ==
Sprinter operation commenced in December 1993, with an official launch on the Ballarat corridor on 16 December 1993, with a special service running to Ballarat station and back, with the then Transport Minister, Alan Brown and other guests on board. A maximum speed of 143 kilometres per hour (89 mph) was achieved during this trip. They were launched on the Bendigo corridor on 17 March 1994, with a special service running to Bendigo station and back. The Sprinters were launched on the Geelong line on 1 September 1994, with a special service running to Geelong station, launching on the Seymour line on 14 December 1994, with a special service running to Seymour station, and finally launching on the Traralgon line on 16 June 1995, to coincide with the newly built Traralgon station.

For operation on the longer routes, a portable buffet cart was trialled - the first such service since 1961, on the Horsham and Warrnambool lines. The cart was delivered to V/Line Passenger at Spencer Street Station on 12 August 1996, and its first use was on the 10:30am Melbourne to Bendigo and 1:20pm return service on the 15th of that month. By September 1996, the cart was in regular use between Seymour and Wodonga.

Over time, the Sprinters also operated to interurban destinations such as Warragul and Kyneton, along with outer suburban destinations like Craigieburn and Sunbury.

Sprinters were the first Victorian passenger trains to run at 130 kilometres per hour (81 mph), and enabled acceleration of some services by up to 15 minutes. Furthermore, their relatively low operating costs allowed for an increase in service frequency on the Ballarat and Bendigo lines. These improved services contributed to an increase in V/Line patronage from 6.5 million passenger journeys in 1993/94 to 7.0 million in 1995/96.

In addition, they performed some longer trips to destinations such as Albury and Echuca, although this was not specially catered for in their designs and thus led to some concerns over amenities such as lack of catering.

Following the introduction of VLocity stock, Sprinters have been returned to short-haul duties. Since 2008, a pair have been hired to Metro Trains Melbourne to operate services on the Stony Point line with units rotated weekly.

Sprinters are used on lines including:

- Seymour line to Seymour
- Stony Point line between Frankston and Stony Point, leased to and operated by Metro Trains Melbourne

Until 31 January 2021, the trains were still in regular use along the Gippsland line to Traralgon and the Geelong line to Geelong, however with the timetable change on that day they are no longer scheduled to run on these lines. In emergencies, they can as required.

The Sprinters were specifically designed to also run on the South Gippsland line to Leongatha and still includes the town on its list of V/Line routes. Although they never ran this service, these trains were operated along the line from Dandenong to Cranbourne for a short period of time from when the V/Line rail service to Leongatha was withdrawn on 24 July 1993 until 24 March 1995 when the line to Cranbourne was electrified, in order to avoid having no rail service to Cranbourne.

Sprinters are seen on the Bendigo line but not on Revenue Service but to shuttle two units to the Bendigo North Workshops for servicing, the driver then returns to Melbourne with two units that have been serviced.

When operating on the Stony Point line, the toilet and drinking fountain are locked out of use.

== Accidents and other problems ==
The Sprinter fleet had a number of teething problems, including failures to trigger level crossings during 1995, which led to their temporary removal from service on 9 January 1996 on all lines except the Bendigo line, where manual, staffed signalling systems made it practical to operate Sprinter trains under Absolute Block conditions. This required that no train be permitted to follow a Sprinter, regardless of signals mid-section, until the Sprinter train had been observed complete at the next staffed signalling location. Signallers were required to advise the next signal box that the oncoming train was a Sprinter, the information flowing consecutively in advance of the train; and when a Sprinter passed a Home Signal, the signaller was required to place that signal to Stop manually and secure it to prevent accidental re-clearing until the next track section was observed clear. Additionally, employees had to be positioned at any mid-section electrically activated level crossings to manually switch them on and off for the passage of Sprinter trains. Trials of various solutions took place between Ballarat and the then-abandoned line to Beaufort on Friday 14 June 1996, and between Spencer Street, St Albans and Sunbury on the following Monday, leading to seven sprinters - 7012-7017 and 7022 - being fitted with track circuit assistors by the end of the month, with the rest of the fleet fitted out in August 1996. Sprinter trains where the leading car was fitted with that equipment were permitted to operate between Melbourne, Geelong and Ballarat; non-fitted Sprinters were to continue operation on the Bendigo line under absolute block conditions on weekdays only, with the extra staff no longer being rostered on weekends.

Sprinters were also noted to have a high fault incidence mainly due to unreliable componentry and electrical circuitry.

The first Sprinter to derail on a public service occurred on 1 May 1994 at Bacchus Marsh. The leading bogie on a unit derailed after rocks were placed on both rails.

Only three major accidents involving a Sprinter have been recorded – the first occurred on 20 November 1996 at the Spencer Street Rail Motor Depot when at around 17:30 Sprinters 7010+7008 shunted out from the platforms at low speed after disembarking passengers from an up service. The cars were to run into the sidings at the Rail Motor Depot, but when the driver got up to adjust the offside rear-vision mirror he was locked out of the cab by the self-closing door. Unable to regain control of the vehicle, the train proceeded to collide with stabled Sprinters 7019+7016.

Despite being the aggressor, 7010's damage was mostly superficial, consisting of broken windows and bent side panelling. 7019 came off much worse; with a buckled frame, the No. 2 cab bent downwards nearly 30 degrees at the saloon doors. The coupler was never recovered. Both trailing Sprinters received little damage.

After the accident investigation was concluded in April 1997, both Sprinters were hauled to Goninan's Bendigo Workshops for assessment. 7010 returned to service in 1998, but it was decided that repairing 7019 would be too costly and so the car was written off. Its interior was gutted before the car was hauled back to Melbourne on 12 July 1998. After being stored in the East Block of Newport Workshops it was later scrapped.

The second occurred on 15 November 2003. Sprinters 7003, 7004 & 7005 were on the 15:49 service to Ballarat when 7003 being the lead unit struck a vehicle stuck on the tracks between Ballan and Gordon. Over 60 people were injured with 7003 rolling on to its side and finishing in a ditch while 7004 & 7005 derailed. 7003 sustained significant damage to its driver compartment and side, 7005 to its driver compartment after striking 7003 as it jackknifed and 7004 sustained only minor damage. The Ballarat line was closed for three days for the clean up.

The third occurred on 2 December 2016 when 7012 caught fire at Seymour railway station while awaiting departure with a passenger service to Melbourne at around 12:30pm.

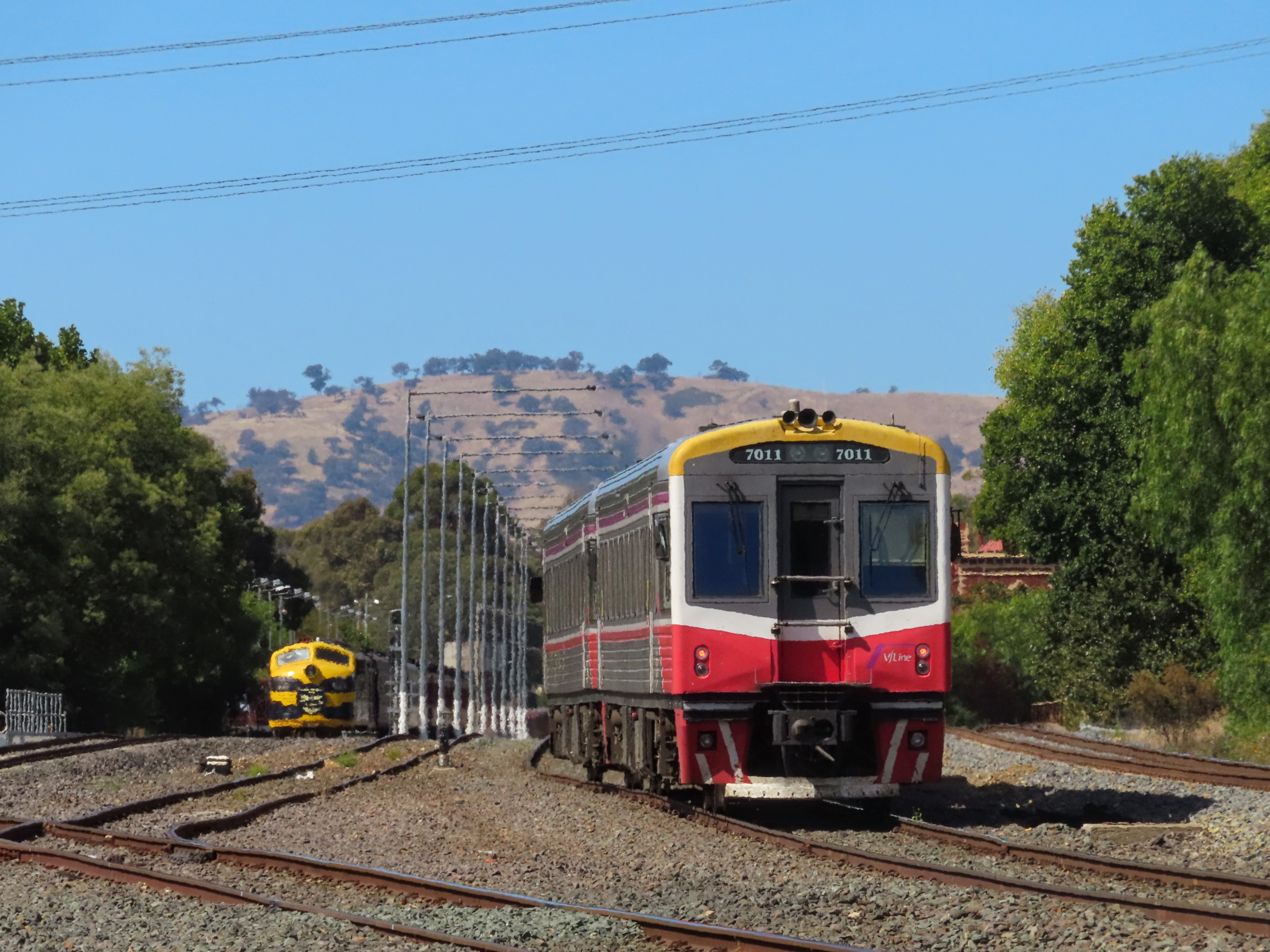
V/Line sprinter 7011 arrives into Seymour.

== Refurbishment ==
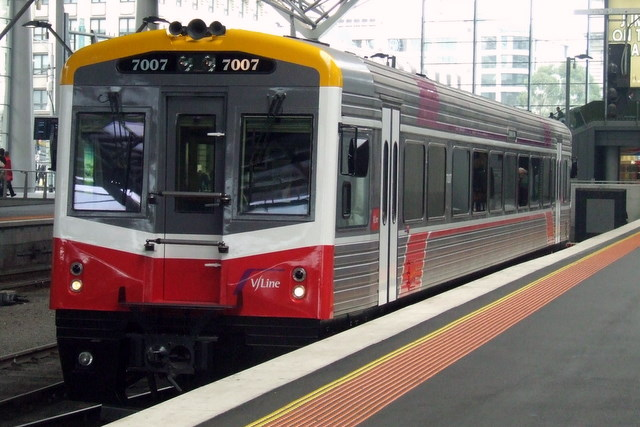
Refurbished 7007

A refurbishment program for the Sprinters was announced in 2007 by Transport Minister Lynne Kosky. The works included reupholstery of the interiors and repainting of the exterior.

In September 2018, Sprinter railcar 7012 re-entered service following a repaint into PTV livery and interior refurbishment.

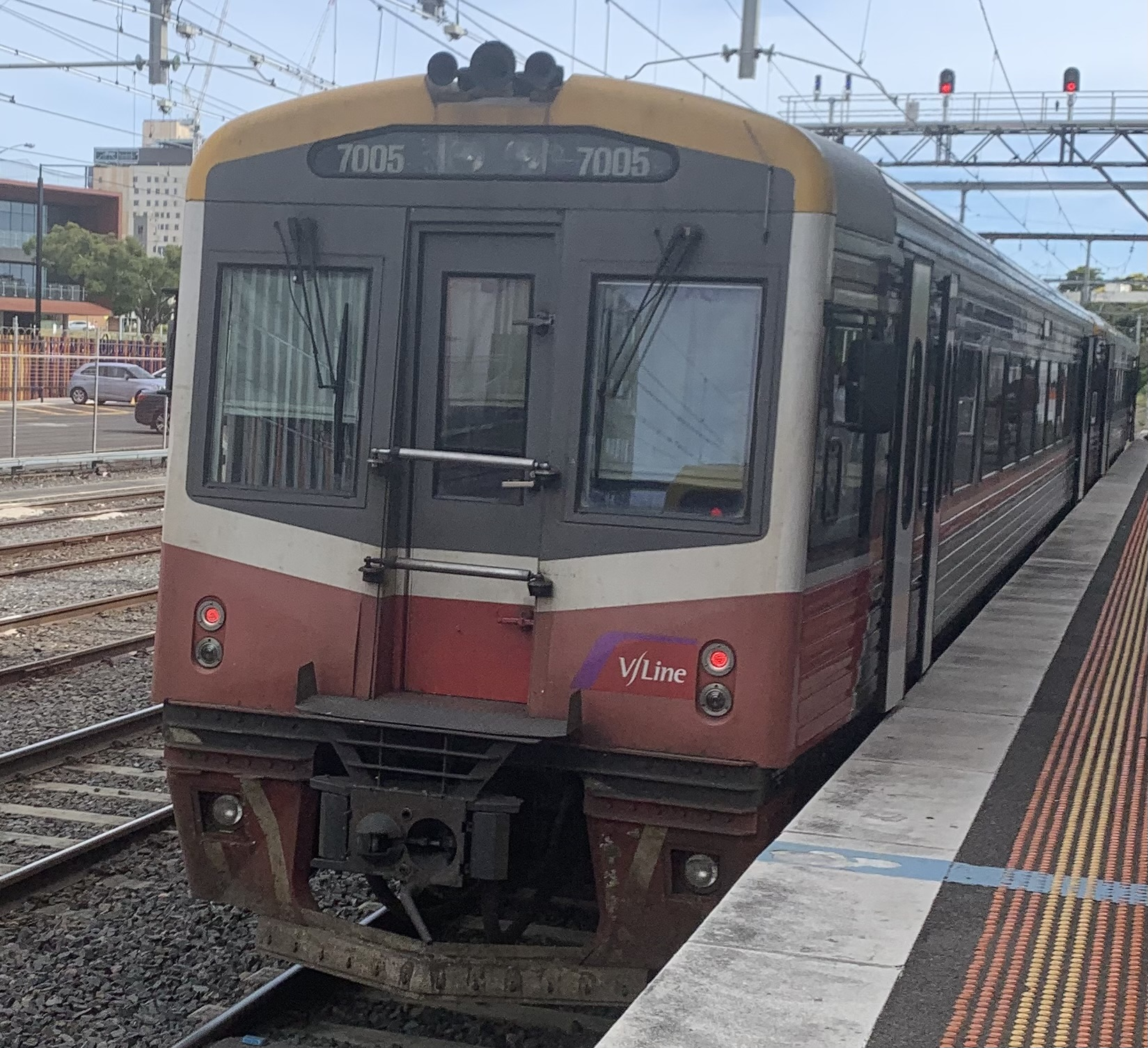
Sprinter 7005, The last V/line sprinter in the old "cheeseburger" livery at Frankston station about to leave to Stony Point

== Names ==
All but the last 3 Sprinters have been named after prominent Victorian sportspersons.

| Number | Delivered | In service | Name | Notes |
|---|---|---|---|---|
| 7001 | 24 Mar 1993 | 20 Dec 1993 | Sir Hubert Opperman | |
| 7002 | 16 Apr 1993 | 20 Dec 1993 | Steve Moneghetti | |
| 7003 | 27 May 1993 | 8 Jan 1994 | James Tomkins | |
| 7004 | 1 Jul 1993 | 8 Jan 1994 | Nick Green | |
| 7005 | 6 Aug 1993 | 8 Feb 1994 | Michael McKay | Last to wear old livery |
| 7006 | 3 Sep 1993 | 1 Mar 1994 | Andrew Cooper | |
| 7007 | 29 Sep 1993 | 28 Mar 1994 | Faith Leech | |
| 7008 | 27 Oct 1993 | 20 Jun 1994 | Gary Ablett | |
| 7009 | 24 Nov 1993 | 15 Jul 1994 | Bob Davis | |
| 7010 | 14 Jan 1994 | 19 Jul 1994 | Andrew Gaze | |
| 7011 | 11 Feb 1994 | 24 Aug 1994 | Raelene Boyle | |
| 7012 | 9 Mar 1994 | 1 Sep 1994 | Roy Higgins | 1st to have PTV Livery |
| 7013 | 20 Apr 1994 | 26 Oct 1994 | Lionel Rose | |
| 7014 | 25 May 1994 | 24 Oct 1994 | Kirstie Marshall | |
| 7015 | 6 Jul 1994 | 14 Nov 1994 | Louise Dobson | |
| 7016 | 27 Jul 1994 | 28 Nov 1994 | Michael Tuck | Hit a Truck in February 2024. Taken to BRW in August 2025. |
| 7017 | 17 Aug 1994 | 28 Dec 1994 | Debbie Flintoff-King | |
| 7018 | 14 Sep 1994 | 7 Feb 1995 | Bill Roycroft | |
| 7019 | 7 Oct 1994 | 1 Mar 1995 | Danni Roche | Scrapped, frame bent after a shunting accident at Spencer Street in 1996. |
| 7020 | 4 Nov 1994 | 5 May 1995 | | |
| 7021 | 16 Dec 1994 | 8 May 1995 | | |
| 7022 | 17 Feb 1995 | 17 Jun 1995 | | Was a part of the consist for the returning of Ararat Services featuring a special headboard. |
