= Kilmore railway station =

Former railway station in Victoria, Australia

Kilmore

General information
- Coordinates: 37°17′52″S 144°56′53″E

History
- Opened: 1 October 1888
Location

Kilmore railway station was a railway station servicing the town of Kilmore, Victoria, Australia. It was located on Rutledge Street, Kilmore, to the east of Assumption College.

It opened on 1 October 1888 along with the first section of the Heathcote branch line. The town had previously been served by a Kilmore station east of the town on the main North East railway line, which was renamed Kilmore East railway station upon its opening. The station was serviced by the Bylands Railway Reservoir.

The local council pressed for the construction of refreshment rooms in 1889, and these were in operation by 1896.

There was a train accident at the station in 1892 and a benzene explosion there in 1903.

It was the junction station for the short-lived Lancefield railway line from 1892 to 1897, after which that line (which had been a through line to Clarkefield railway station) was truncated to a spur line from Clarkefield to Lancefield).

In 1912, it was reported that there had been frequent complaints made about the station being undermanned. The refreshment rooms were destroyed by fire in 1918. There were delays in rebuilding the station due to the low passenger traffic on the branch line They were later rebuilt, though were the subject of complaints that the rebuilt rooms were inadequate.

It was closed to passengers in August 1965. The line through Kilmore closed to all traffic in November 1968.

In 2018, the local council voted to alter the planning scheme to allow for development on the vacant former station site.
