= Seymour railway station =

Railway station in Victoria, Australia

Seymour
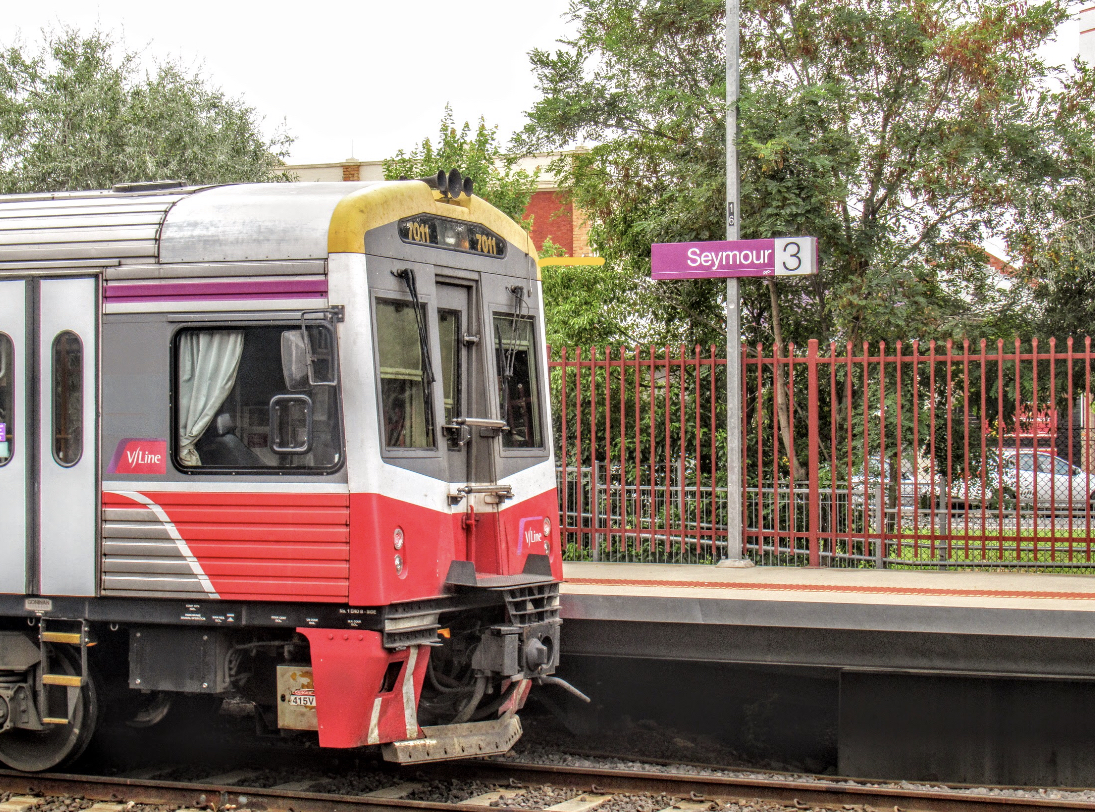
- Sprinter 7011 arriving at Platform 3, January 2020

General information
- Location: Station Street, Seymour, Victoria 3660; Shire of Mitchell; Australia
- Coordinates: 37°01′28″S 145°08′18″E
- System: PTV regional rail station
- Owner: VicTrack
- Operator: V/Line
- Lines: Seymour Shepparton (Tocumwal); Albury Southern (North East)
- Distance: 98.70 km from Southern Cross
- Platforms: 3 (1 island, 1 side)
- Tracks: 4
- Connections: Bus; Coach

Construction
- Structure type: Ground
- Parking: Yes
- Cycle facilities: Yes
- Accessible: Yes

Other information
- Status: Operational, staffed part-time
- Station code: SEY
- Fare zone: Myki zone 6/7
- Website: Public Transport Victoria

History
- Opened: 20 November 1872; 153 years ago
- Rebuilt: 2009; 17 years ago

Services
| Preceding station | V/Line | Following station |
|---|---|---|
| Broadmeadows towards Southern Cross | Albury line | Avenel towards Albury |
| Tallarook towards Southern Cross | Seymour line | Terminus |
| Tallarook Limited service towards Southern Cross | Shepparton line | Nagambie towards Shepparton |
| Broadford towards Southern Cross | Shepparton line | Nagambie towards Shepparton |
| Preceding station | NSW TrainLink | Following station |
| Broadmeadows towards Melbourne | NSW TrainLink Southern Line Melbourne XPT | Benalla towards Sydney |
Location
- Location within Victoria

Seymour railway station is a regional railway station on the Tocumwal and North East lines in Victoria, Australia. It serves the town of the same name, and opened on 20 November 1872. The station is the terminus for V/Line Seymour line services. V/Line services to Shepparton and Albury, and New South Wales XPT services to Sydney, also stop at the station.

A locomotive depot previously operated north of the station. Today, it is the home of the Seymour Railway Heritage Centre, and is still used to stable V/Line trains. The station also had a goods yard opposite the main passenger platform.

== History ==
The railway to Seymour officially opened on 20 November 1872. Because the bridge over the Goulburn River was not finished, the line from Essendon station had opened on 18 April 1872 to a temporary terminus at School House Lane.

Mangalore station, now demolished, was located north of Seymour, at the junction of the North East and Tocumwal lines. School House Lane / Dysart Sidings / Goulburn Junction was located between Seymour and Tallarook stations.

=== Station building and platforms ===
When the station opened, only a single platform was provided, with temporary timber station buildings and three tracks. A brick building was erected in 1874/1875, with extensions and alterations made in 1883/1884, including a new street façade. In 1886, a subway was provided to the platform from Station Street and, in 1887, the street entrance to the station was removed to permit the creation of the back platform. A level crossing was constructed to provide access to the station. More alterations to the station occurred in 1926.

To house railway employees and their families, the Victorian Railways erected a number of Departmental Residences adjacent to the station. Around the start of the 20th century, there were 29 residences, increasing to 82 by the 1960s. They have since been sold to private owners.

Although the station looks like one large building from Station Street, it is made up of numerous smaller buildings behind a common façade. The refreshment room is a grand two-storey building, while the ticket office and waiting room is a collection of smaller buildings. Though the standard gauge line to Albury, which opened in 1962, passed the station, a platform was not provided on the line until 1974. However, it was only one carriage long and was not used for regular services. It was removed in 2008, when the track serving Platform 1 was converted to standard gauge. The interior of the station was altered to the current layout in 1997, when a general refurbishment was carried out, with the parcels office being converted into a waiting room and toilets.

In 2008, there was a $1.5 million upgrade of the bus interchange, with the subway to the station being rebuilt with a shallower grade, to allow wheelchair access. The works were done in preparation for the Australian Rail Track Corporation's North-East Rail Revitalisation Project, during which all V/Line trains north of Seymour were replaced by buses while gauge-conversion of the line was undertaken. A part of the project also involved the construction of a new broad gauge Platform 3, on the western side of the yard, which opened in November 2009.

=== Refreshment room ===
A railway refreshment room was opened at Seymour station in 1873, replacing the one at Kilmore East. It later became the largest country refreshment room in the state.

By 1875, the room was serving at least six trains per day, with 15 minutes permitted for passengers to eat. In 1884, the rooms were expanded, with new buffet and dining rooms. Buffet patrons ordered and collected their food from a counter and ate elsewhere, while dining room patrons sat down and received table service. Refreshment services were originally managed under lease, but were taken over by the Victorian Railways in 1919, as part of the creation of the Refreshment Services Branch in 1920.

The refreshment facilities catered for 150 people standing in the buffet and 112 people seated in the dining room and, at its peak, was staffed by 34 employees who lived in a cottage complex near the station. By 1976, the rooms were in decline, with a staff of 11 serving only light refreshments. The facility closed on 8 October 1981, when on-train catering was provided on all services passing through the station. The buffet room was refurbished in 1993–1995 for community uses, but the dining room is used for storage.

While the Seymour to Albury line was being upgraded to standard gauge, the refreshment rooms reopened as a café in November 2008 to cater for V/Line Albury/Wodonga line passengers who used Seymour to transfer between coaches and trains.

=== Locomotive depot ===
The locomotive depot at Seymour existed from the opening of the station until 1993. It was the home of the S class 4-6-2 Pacific locomotives, which hauled the Spirit of Progress.

The depot was originally located just to the north of the station, with a two-locomotive shed and a 42-foot (13 m) turntable. It was moved to the current location in 1889, and a new nine-track, roundhouse-style shed was erected in timber and corrugated iron, along with a coal stage and brick offices. In 1902, the roundhouse was extended to thirteen bays and, in 1910, it was extended to twenty bays, which almost made a complete circle. In 1890, the original turntable was replaced by a 50-foot (15 m) version, and by a 70-foot (21 m) version in 1907. In the 1930s, an electric turntable was provided, until replaced by a more modern version in 1954.

At its peak of operation, in June 1950, 245 railway men worked at Seymour Locomotive Depot, made up of 60 drivers, 57 firemen, 41 cleaners, 14 mechanics, 53 shed staff, nine rail motor staff, and 11 train examiners. By 1958, with the advent of diesel locomotives, the number of staff had declined to 181. The last steam locomotive housed there withdrawn in 1966.

Much of the roundhouse was removed in 1961 in conjunction with construction of the standard gauge line, and the rest of it was demolished in May 1971, leaving just the workshop buildings. By 1976, only 125 people were employed at the depot and, by the 1980s, locomotives were no longer based there. It was officially closed on 8 April 1993. Today, it used to stable V/Line trains, as well as being the home of the Seymour Railway Heritage Centre.

=== Goods shed ===
A goods shed was provided at Seymour in September 1873, of the same though-track, round-roof style seen at Kilmore East, Tallarook, Avenel, and Euroa stations. In 1885, the yard was extended from three to nine tracks, and a new, smaller goods shed was provided. It was lengthened in 1909, and again in 1930.

Until the 1960s, the main outbound traffic was agricultural produce, wool, firewood and timber, and there were incoming supplies for the town. By the 1970s, small consignments of goods were only handled by a number of larger stations, with road transport used the rest of the way. The Seymour Freight Centre opened on 8 February 1978, to serve the local area, and remained in use until 27 April 1985.

== Platforms and services ==
Seymour has one island platform and one side platform. It is served by V/Line Seymour, Shepparton and Albury line trains. It is also served by NSW TrainLink XPT trains travelling between Sydney and Melbourne.

Seymour platform arrangement
| Platform | Line | Destination |
|---|---|---|
| 1 | Albury line NSW TrainLink Southern | Southern Cross, Albury, Sydney |
| 2 | Seymour line Shepparton line | Southern Cross, Shepparton |
| 3 | Seymour line Shepparton line | Southern Cross, Shepparton |

== Transport links ==
Mitchell Transit operates five bus routes to and from Seymour station, under contract to Public Transport Victoria:

- 1 : to Seymour East
- 2 : to Seymour North
- 3 : to Puckapunyal
- 4 : from Wimble Street (AM peak)
- 5 : to Seymour North/East (PM peak)

Fallons Bus Service operates one bus route to and from Seymour station, under contract to Public Transport Victoria:

- to Alexandra

V/Line operates road coach services from Seymour station to Albury, Echuca, Melbourne, Shepparton, Tocumwal and Wangaratta.

== Gallery ==
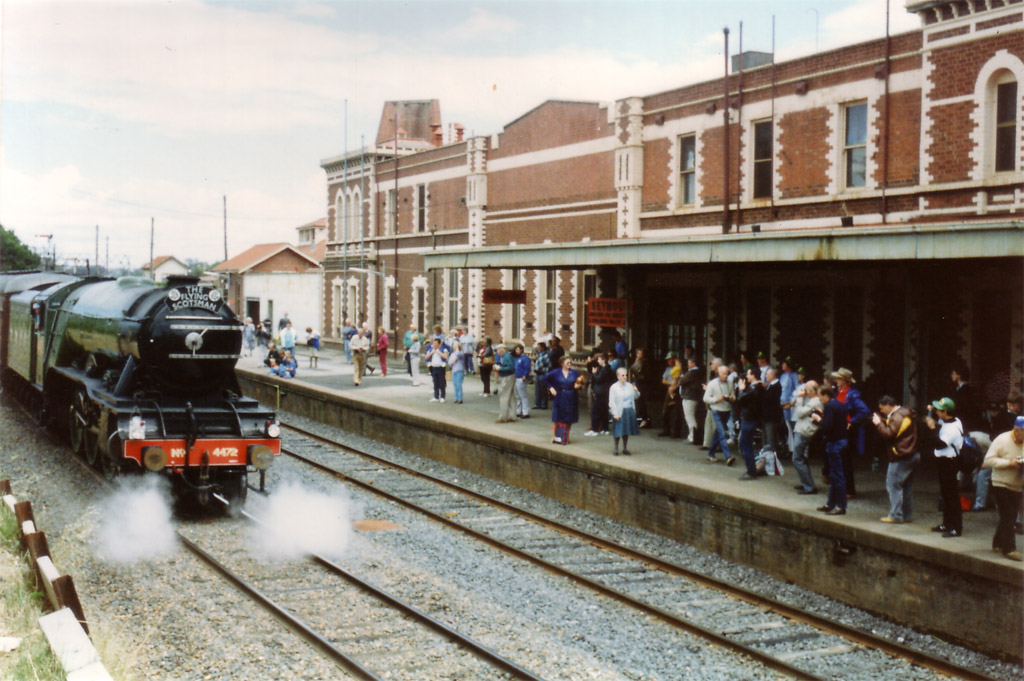
4472 Flying Scotsman arrives at Seymour, 1989

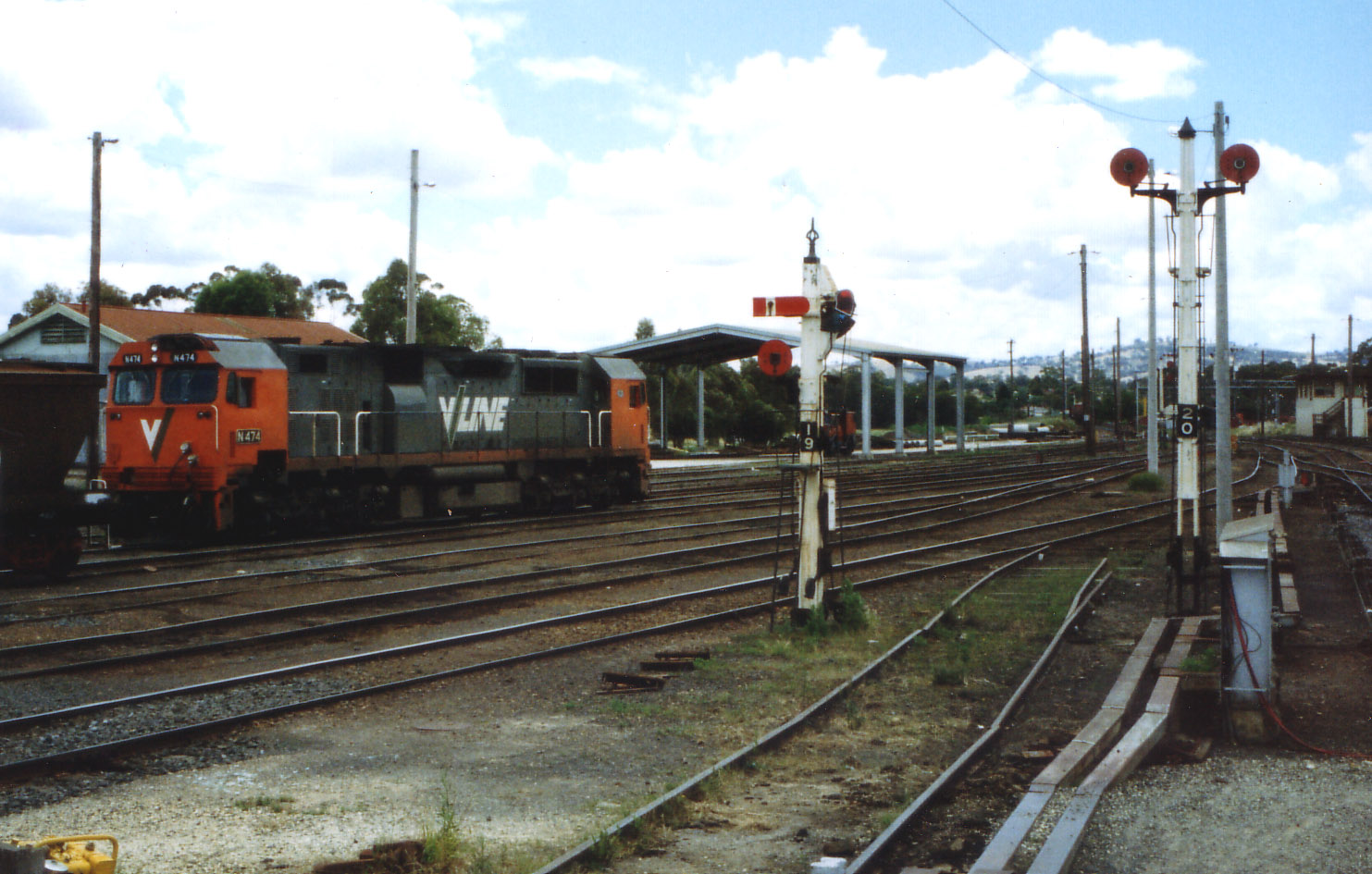
V/Line locomotive N474 at Seymour, 1989

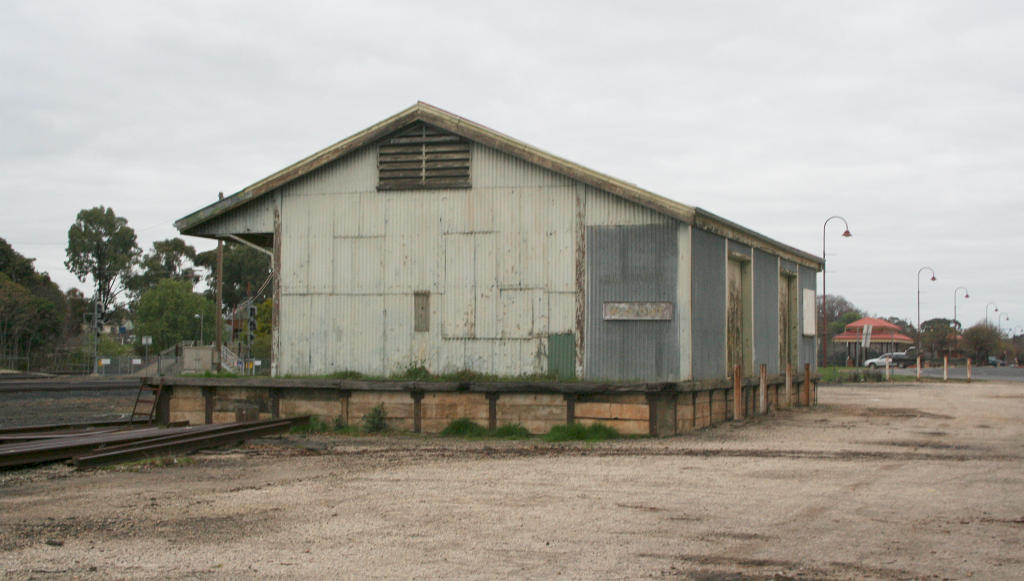
Southbound view of the goods shed, July 2008

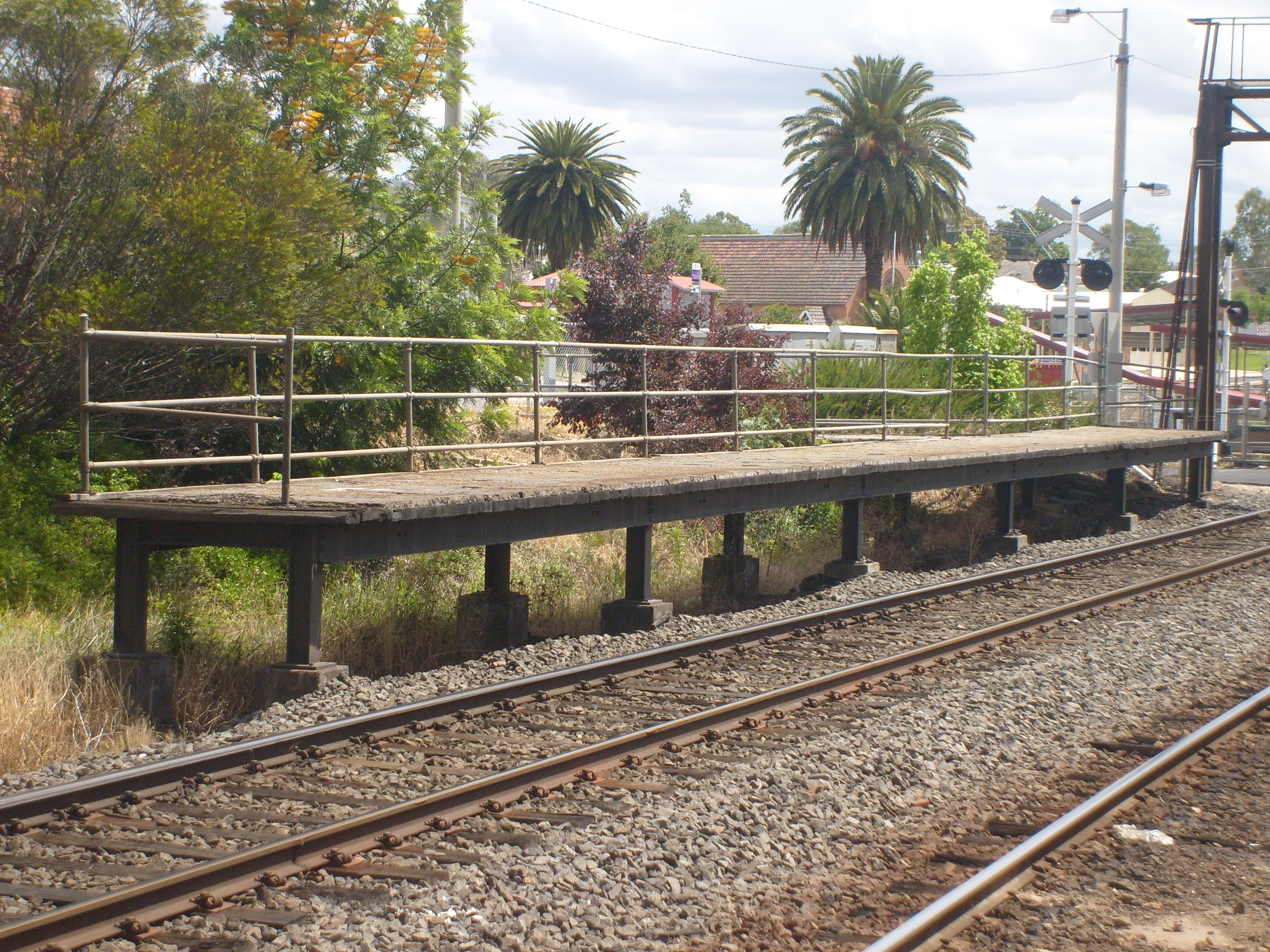
Former standard gauge platform, November 2008

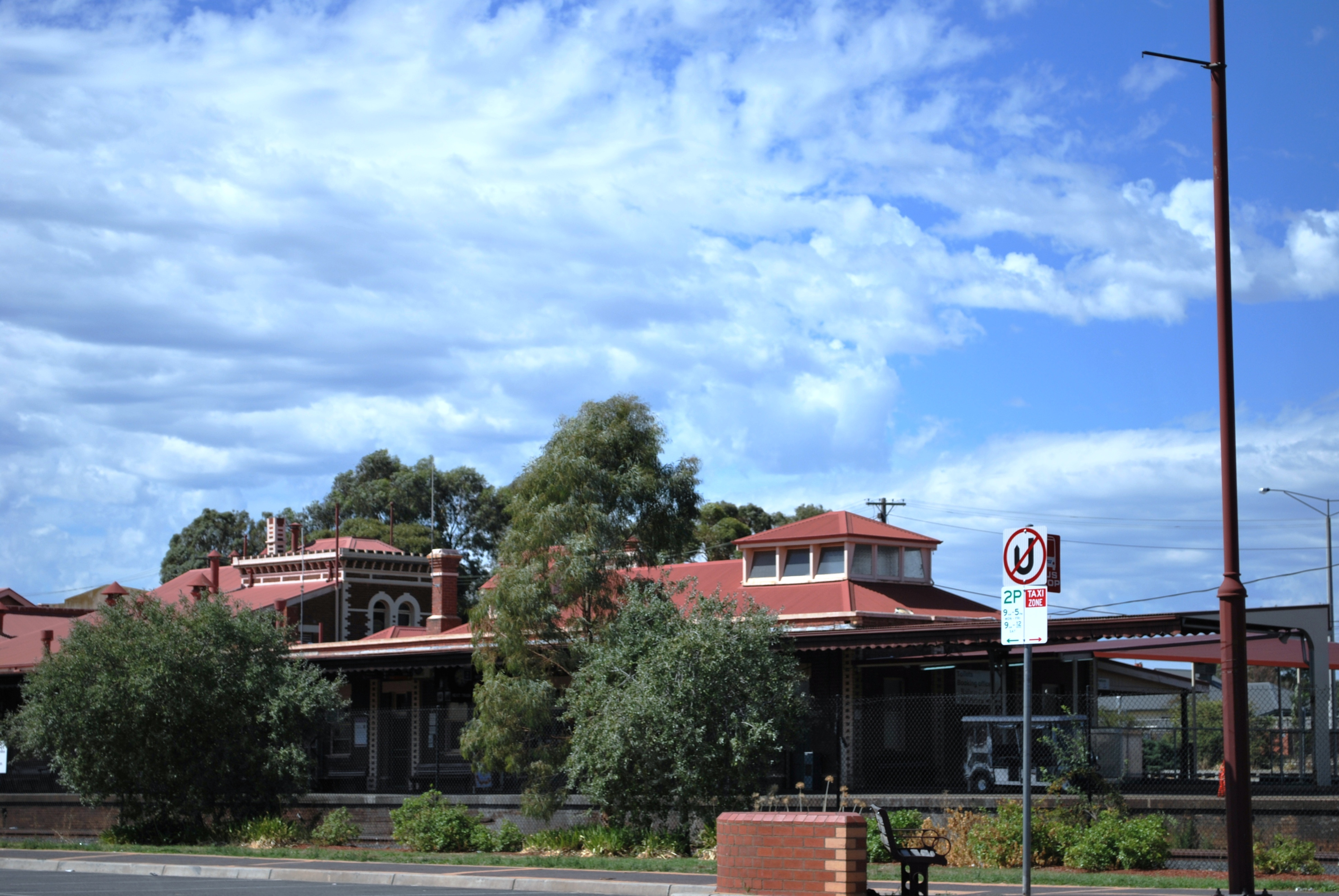
Eastbound view of the station building, viewed from Station Street, March 2009
