= Sydney–Melbourne rail corridor =

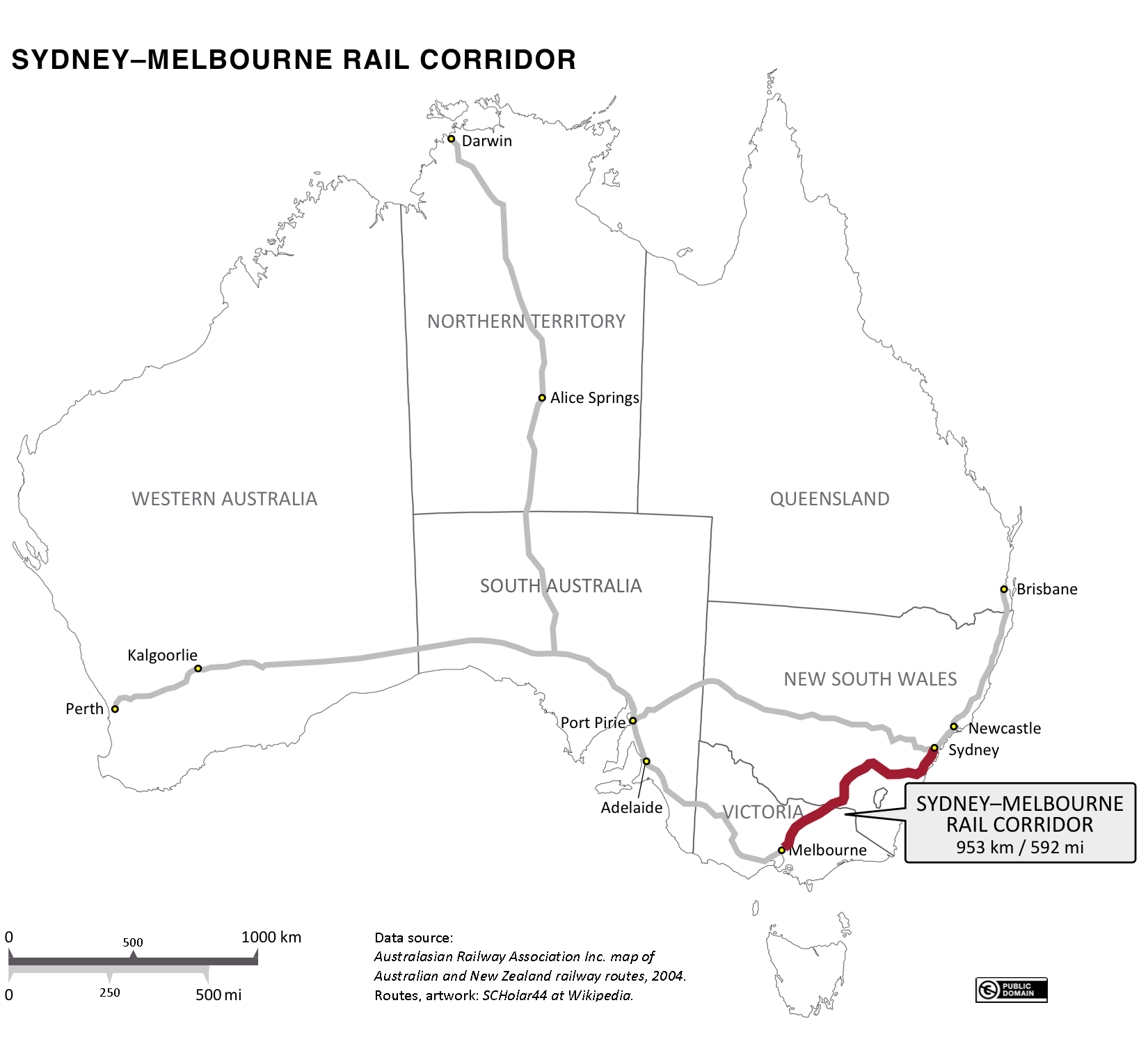

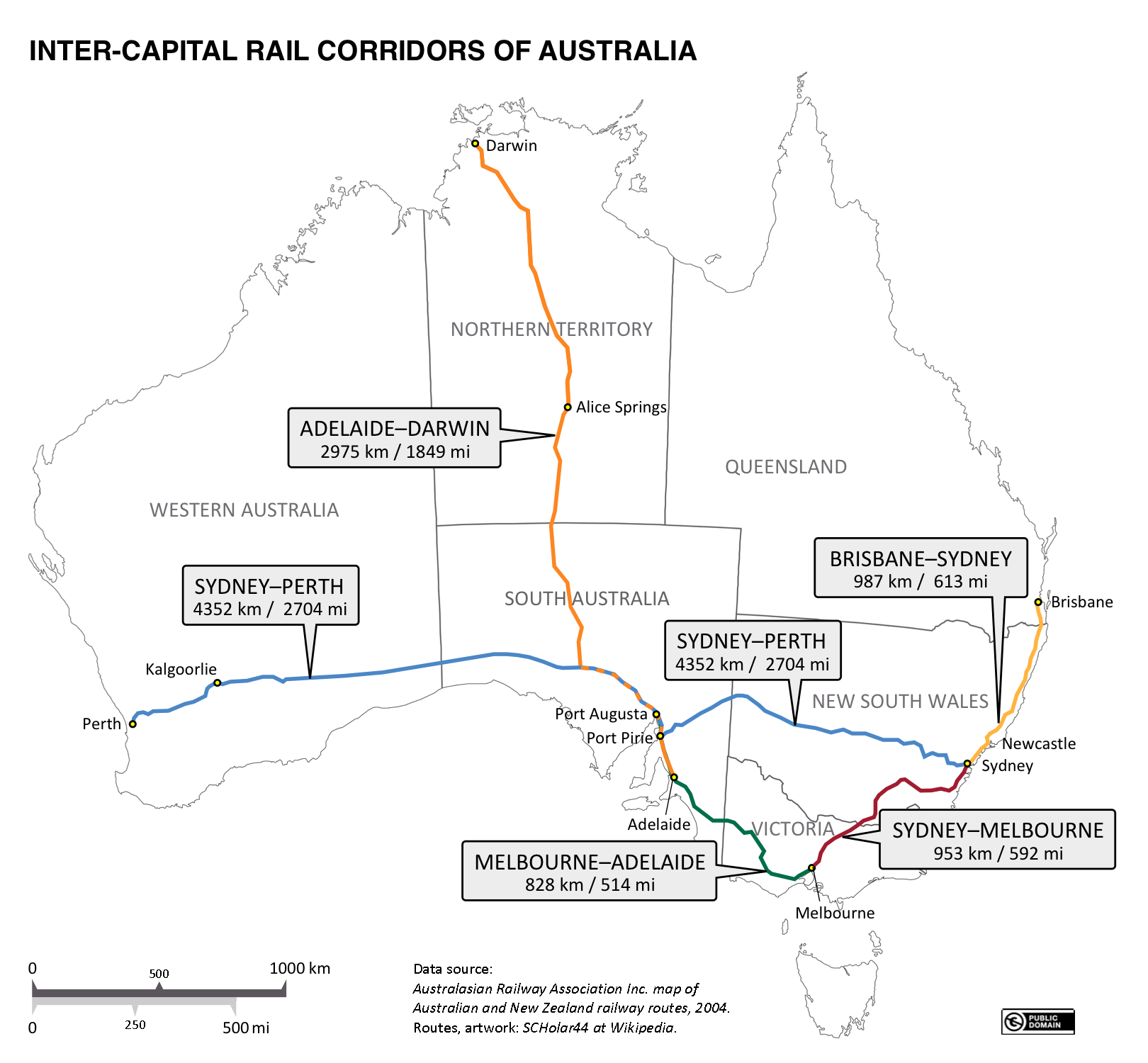

The Sydney–Melbourne rail corridor consists of the 953-kilometre (592-mile) long 1435 mm (4 ft 8 1/2 in) standard-gauge main line between the Australian state capitals of Sydney (New South Wales) and Melbourne (Victoria), the two largest cities in Australia and the lines immediately connected to it. Freight and passenger services operate along the route, including the NSW TrainLink XPT passenger service.

The corridor consists of the Main Southern railway line from Sydney's Central Station to Albury Station – 646 km (401 mi) – and Victoria's North East railway line – 307 km (191 mi) – from Albury to Melbourne's freight terminals and Southern Cross station.

== History ==
In 1883, the 1600 mm (5 ft 3 in) Victorian Railways broad gauge line met the 1435 mm (4 ft 8 1/2 in) New South Wales Government Railways standard gauge line at Albury. The two tracks were separated by an island platform 350 metres (1150 feet) long. The break of gauge, for both passenger and freight traffic, continued until 1962, when the Victorian North East standard gauge line was completed.

Intercapital passenger services such as the Spirit of Progress, Southern Aurora, and Intercapital Daylight once operated in the corridor.

Sydney to Melbourne XPTs don't commonly use the Main Southern railway line between Lidcombe and Glenfield, instead using the East Hills line.

== Passenger services ==
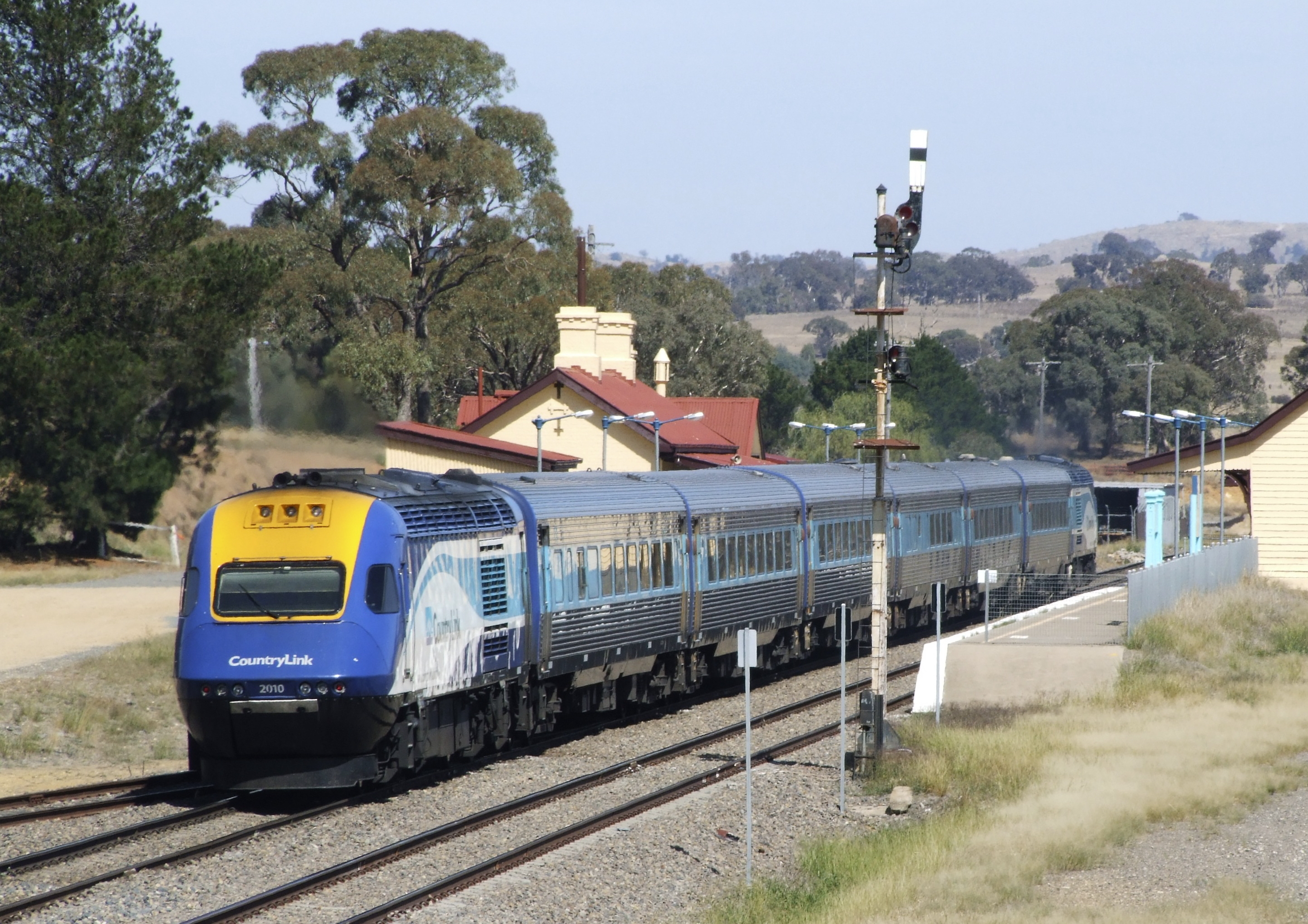
The NSW TrainLink XPT, here at Gunning in 2009, provides two daily train services in both directions between Sydney and Melbourne

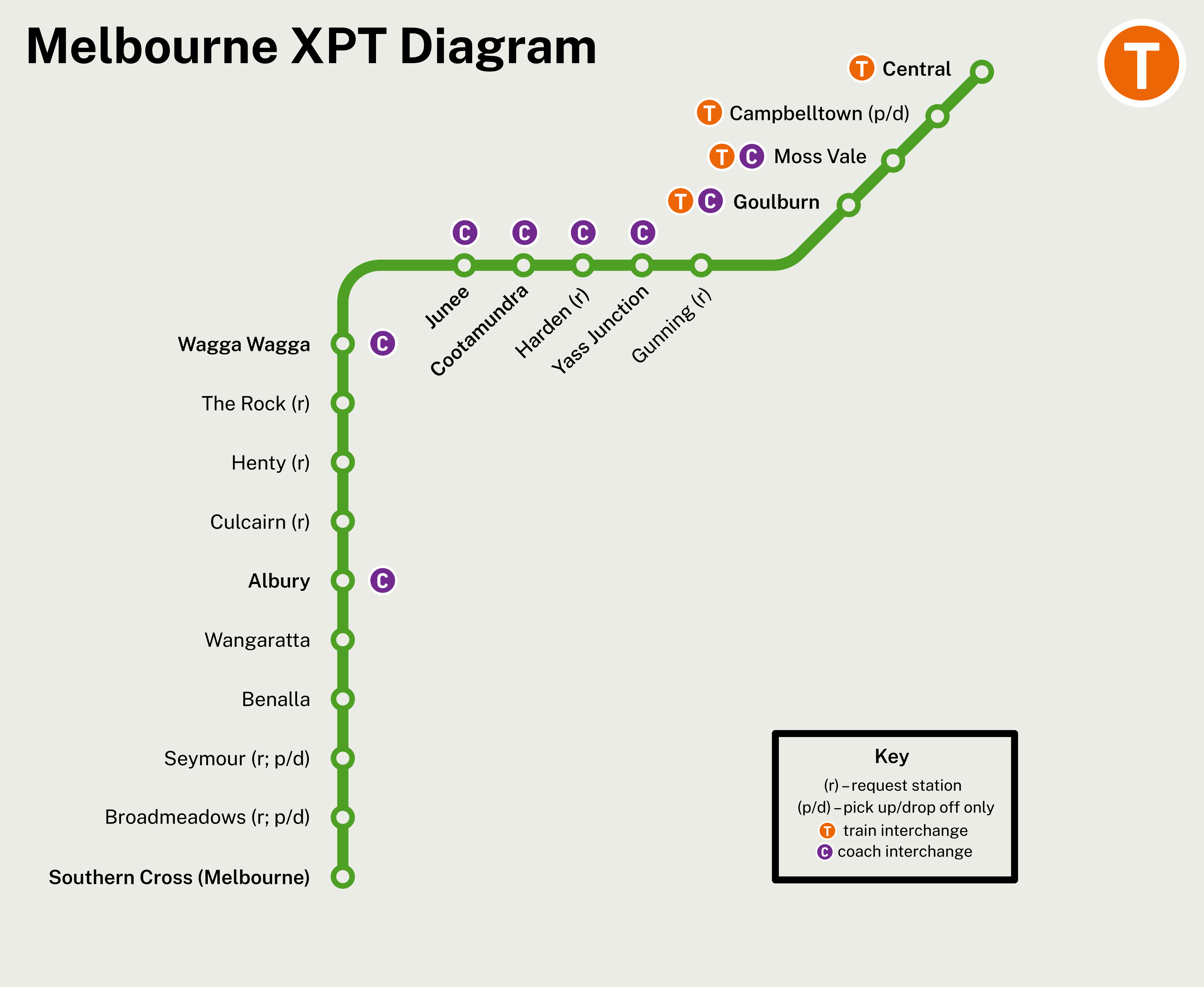
A diagram of the Melbourne XPT.

The XPT service runs two return trips each day between Melbourne and Sydney, making scheduled stops at Broadmeadows, Seymour, Benalla, Wangaratta, Albury, Wagga Wagga, Junee, Cootamundra, Yass Junction, Goulburn, Moss Vale, Campbelltown and Central with optional stops at Culcairn, Henty, The Rock, Harden and Gunning. The stops at Broadmeadows and Seymour were introduced in November 2012. Before then, the XPT ran express from Melbourne to Benalla.

All four daily XPT services take about 11 hours.

== Infrastructure shortcomings and upgrades ==
A huge deficiency in interstate rail investment compared with investment in highways has existed since the 1960s. Although the standard gauge line is about 960 km (600 mi) long, the journey on the road equivalent of the corridor – the Hume Highway – is now about 90 km (56 mi) shorter than the rail line. Relatively high road speeds are possible because the highway now bypasses many of the towns where there were speed limits. In 2013, the entire Hume Highway was completed as a dual carriageway, whereas the rail line is still single-track in some places – a significant impediment to continuous running.

Another major impediment of the corridor is the prevalence of curves with small radii – some are only 280 metres (920 ft) – and the sheer number of curves, which are equivalent to rotating the train by 72 circles (36 circles to the right and 36 circles to the left) along the entire route. (Note: steep gradients – some are 1:38 or 2.6% adjusted for curvature.) Consequently, some sections of the line are signalled for a top speed of only 65 kilometres per hour (40 mph). Even so, freight trains often struggle to reach that speed in places.

Maximum benefit, whether improved transit times and reduced diesel fuel consumption and emissions, accrues from routes being straightened, and gradients reduced, on a large scale. However, such proposals come with greater risk of delay or cancellation. In a climate of long-term failure to prioritise investment in rail and with earlier completion in mind, funding has most often gone to projects with smaller deviations over shorter distances.

For a long time, the corridor was double track from Sydney to Junee, and single track from there on with a number of short crossing loops, but between 2008 and 2011 about 200 km (120 mi) of the former broad-gauge track between Seymour and Wodonga was standardised to form a double track section north of Seymour. A 5 km (3.1 mi) double-track northern bypass of Wodonga was also constructed.

The single track resumes just south of the Murray River and Albury. Several passing loops of about 7 km (4.3 mi) length each have been added between Junee and Albury and between Seymour and Craigieburn. These changes, and full concrete sleepering of the line and many signalling upgrades were completed by 2012. Old 47 kg/m (95 lb/yd) rail between Melbourne and Albury was replaced with new 60 kg/m (121 lb/yd) rail.

Since passenger trains receive priority over freight trains, a freight-only track known as the Southern Sydney Freight Line was added in Sydney in 2012. This single track line (with two crossing loops) allows freight trains to travel into and out of the freight terminals during passenger peak times. Some works have also been made in Melbourne to improve the flow of freight trains into the port.

Modest proposals for straightening alignments in the Sydney–Melbourne rail corridor have included a minor 9.2 km (5.7 mi) Jindalee deviation, advocated in a 2006 report, and upgrading of sections for medium speeds, advocated in 2022. Another proposal involved use of tilting trains, which can travel through curved sections of track at speeds of up to 170 km/h (110 mph) and reduce the 11-hour journey time between Sydney and Melbourne to about six hours.

A number of deviations have been variously proposed for improving the alignment between Junee and Sydney. About 260 km (160 mi) of winding track would be replaced by about 200 km (120 mi) of straighter track. Although a 2008 Australian Rail Track Corporation (ARTC) report documented plans for a few minor deviations to be completed by 2014, as of 2023 the work had not started.

== High-speed rail proposals ==
Based on the international definition of a minimum top speed of 200 km/h (120 mph) in passenger service, high-speed rail in Australia does not yet exist. Numerous proposals for high-speed rail infrastructure in Australia, also known as very fast train projects, have been conducted since the early 1980s, but none has proceeded further.

Various combinations of the route between Melbourne, Canberra, Goulburn, Sydney, Newcastle, Coffs Harbour, Gold Coast and Brisbane have been the subject of detailed investigation by prospective operators, government departments and advocacy groups.

Most recently, phase 1 of a $20m high-speed rail study was released in 2011. It proposed a corridor similar to a 2001 study, with prospective stations located in Melbourne, Tullamarine, Albury, Canberra, Goulburn, Sydney, Newcastle, the Mid–North Coast, Gold Coast and Brisbane. The cost was estimated at $61 billion, but it was noted that cost blowouts or adoption of more difficult alignments could raise the cost to more than $100 billion. The report urged the authorities to acquire land on the corridor as soon as practicable to avoid further price rises.

Work on phase 2 of the study culminated in the release of the High speed rail study phase 2 report in 2013. Building on the work of phase 1, it was more comprehensive in objectives and scope and refined many of the phase 1 estimates, particularly demand and cost estimates.

== Work consulted ==
- Avery, Rod (2006). Freight Across the Nation: The Australian Superfreighter Experience. Brisbane: Copyright Publishing Co. ISBN 1876344474.
