= Seymour line =

Passenger rail service in Victoria, Australia

Seymour

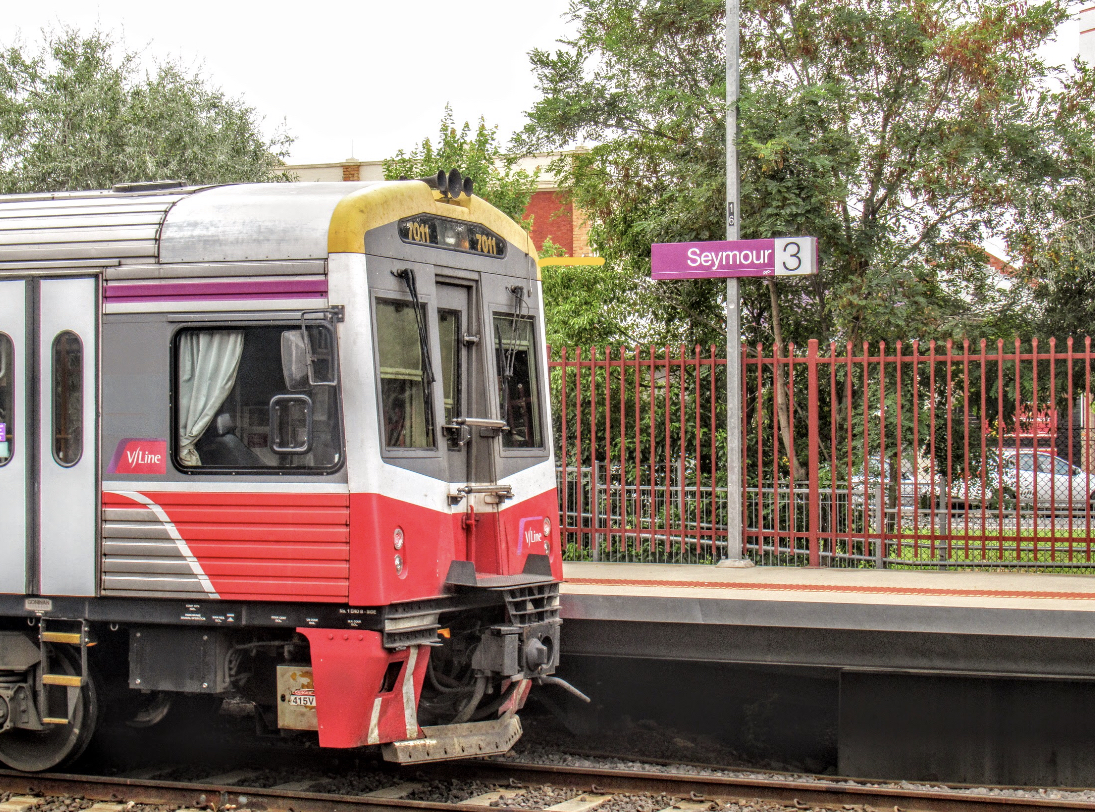
- V/Line Sprinter train at Seymour

Overview
- Service type: Regional rail
- Status: Operational
- Locale: Victoria, Australia
- Current operator: V/Line
- Ridership: 1.75 million (FY2023–2024)
- Website: V/Line Seymour on X

Route
- Termini: Seymour; Southern Cross
- Stops: 13
- Distance travelled: 101.69 km (63.19 mi)
- Average journey time: 1 hour 32 minutes
- Service frequency: 26–67 minutes weekdays peak; 60–147 minutes off-peak and weekends (some services provided by Shepparton services)
- Line used: Tocumwal

On-board services
- Class: Economy
- Disabled access: Most services
- Catering facilities: No

Technical
- Rolling stock: VLocity; Sprinter
- Track gauge: 1,600 mm (5 ft 3 in)
- Electrification: 1500 V DC overhead
- Operating speed: 130 km/h (81 mph) maximum
- Track owner: VicTrack

Shepparton

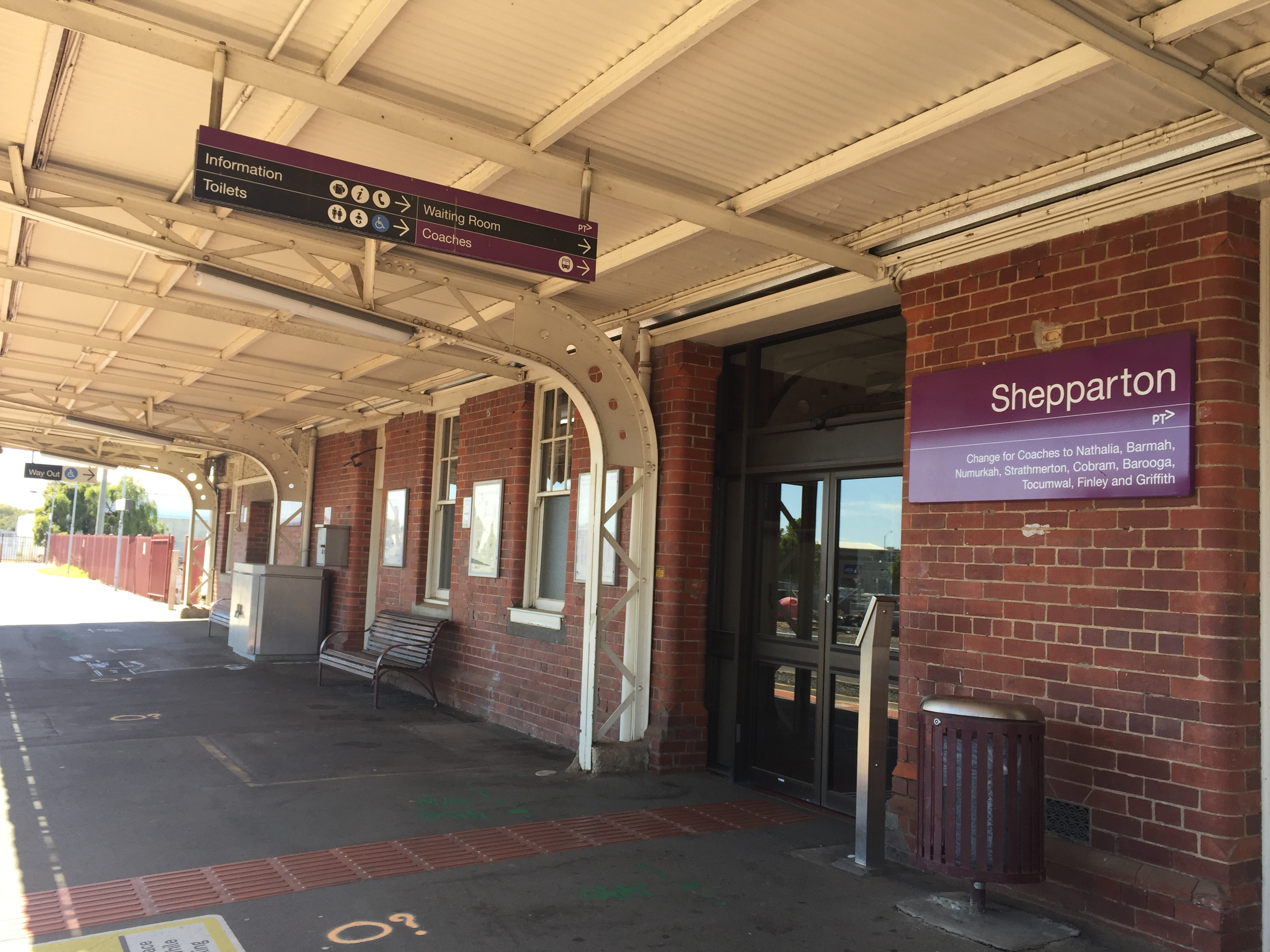
- Platform at Shepparton

Overview
- Service type: Regional rail
- Status: Operational
- Locale: Victoria, Australia
- Current operator: V/Line

Route
- Termini: Shepparton; Southern Cross
- Stops: 16
- Distance travelled: 184.84 km (114.85 mi)
- Average journey time: 2 hour 32 minutes
- Service frequency: 5 Southern Cross-bound services, 5 Shepparton-bound services on weekdays; 3 services on weekends each direction
- Line used: Tocumwal

On-board services
- Class: Economy
- Disabled access: Yes
- Catering facilities: None

Technical
- Rolling stock: VLocity
- Track gauge: 1,600 mm (5 ft 3 in)
- Electrification: None
- Operating speed: Shepparton-Seymour: 115 km/h (71 mph) Maximum; Seymour-Southern Cross: 130 km/h (80 mph) Maximum
- Track owner: VicTrack

The Seymour line is a regional passenger rail service operated by V/Line in Victoria, Australia. It serves 13 stations towards its terminus in the regional city of Seymour. It is the fifth most-used regional rail service in Victoria (behind the Gippsland, Bendigo, Ballarat, and Geelong services), carrying 1.75 million passengers in the 2023–2024 financial year.

Beyond Seymour, the Shepparton line continues further north to Shepparton; and the Albury line continues north-east to its terminus at Albury, just over the border in New South Wales.

== Services ==
V/Line operates hourly passenger services from Seymour to Melbourne, using Sprinter and VLocity railcars. Five return services operate to Shepparton on weekdays; three return services operate on weekends; all are operated by the VLocity. Until 31 October 2022, services to Shepparton were operated by the N set, which included a buffet and first-class seating, this is no longer available as the VLocity does not have catering facilities and first class seating on board. H type carriages were also used on the line until the introduction of the VLocity on the Shepparton line. Like the VLocity, it did not have a buffet and first class on board.

Services generally stop all stations between Shepparton and Donnybrook in both directions. Some services run express through Donnybrook, Heathcote Junction and Tallarook. Some services stop at Essendon and North Melbourne on weekdays; all services stop at Broadmeadows. At metropolitan stations, services towards Seymour and Shepparton only stop to pick up passengers, and services towards Southern Cross only stop to allow passengers to alight.

=== Platforms ===
Platform 1 connects to the Albury Line, which uses standard gauge (SG). Platform 2 connects the Seymour and Shepparton services, which utilise the broad gauge (BG) track.

== Gallery ==
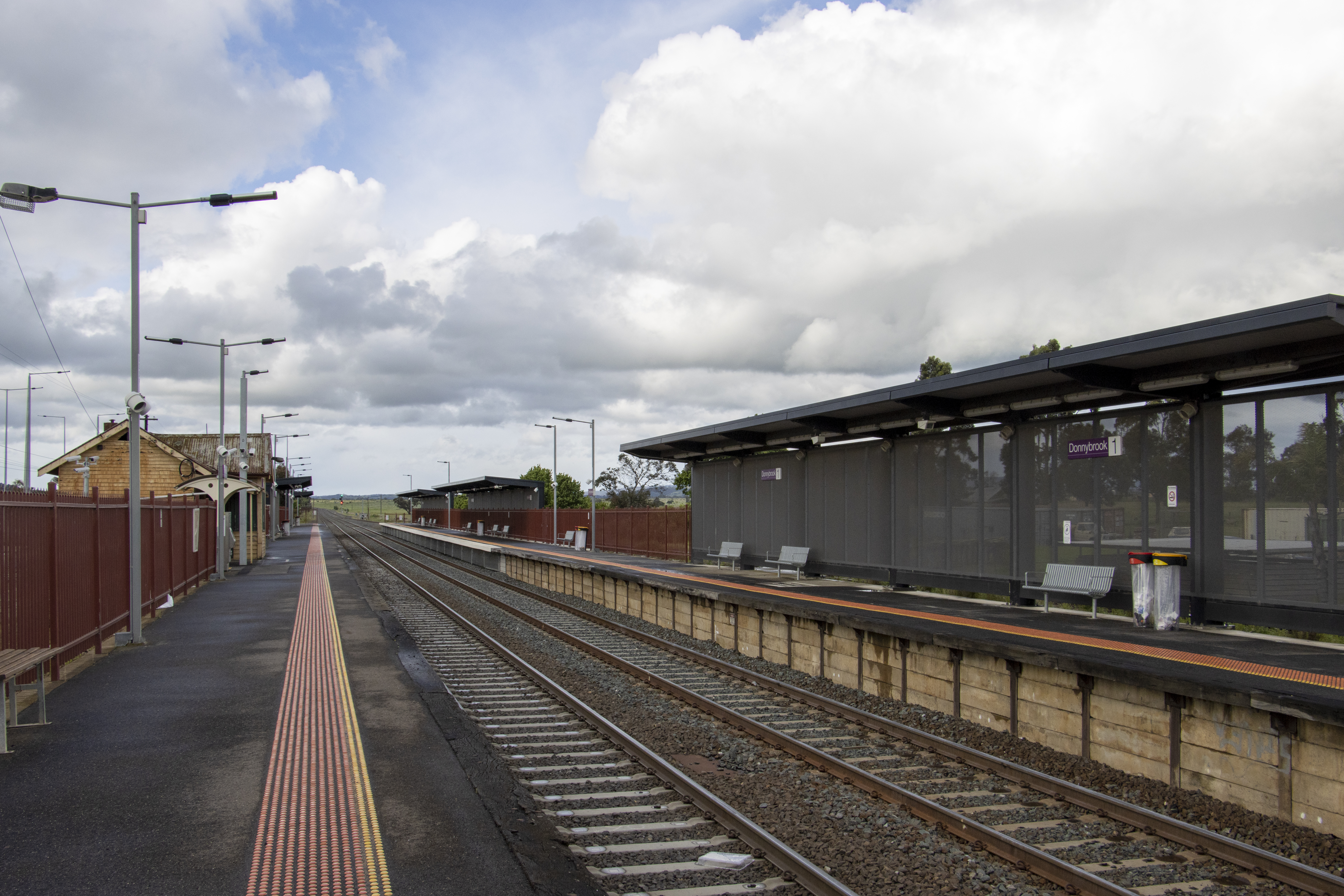
Donnybrook railway station in 2022, upgraded as part of the Regional Rail Revival project

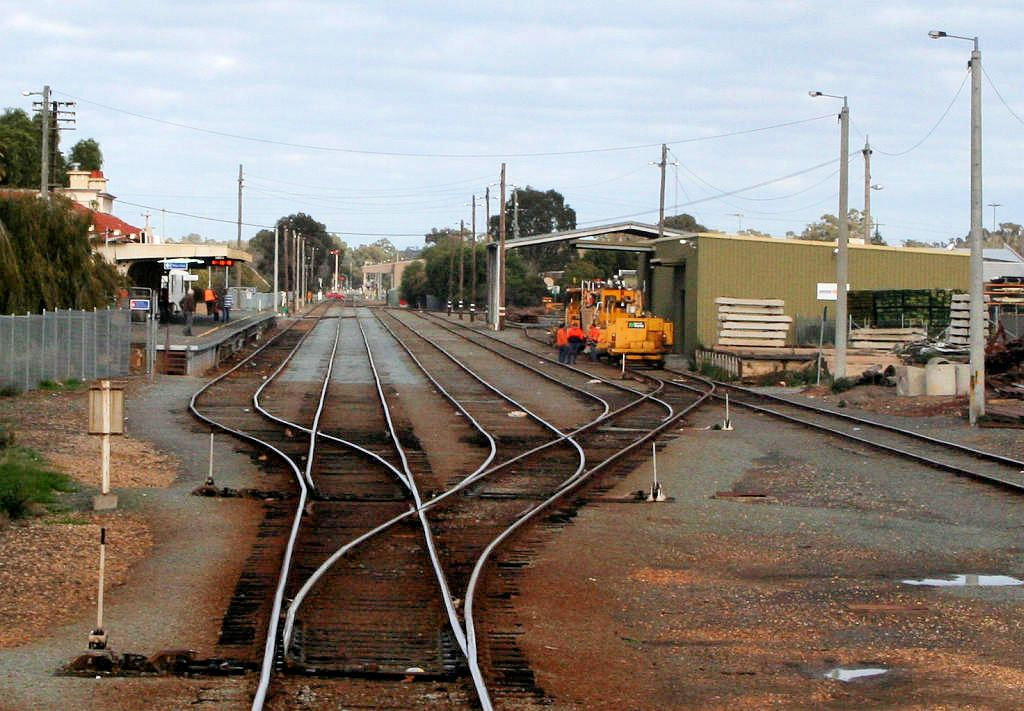
Shepparton track layout

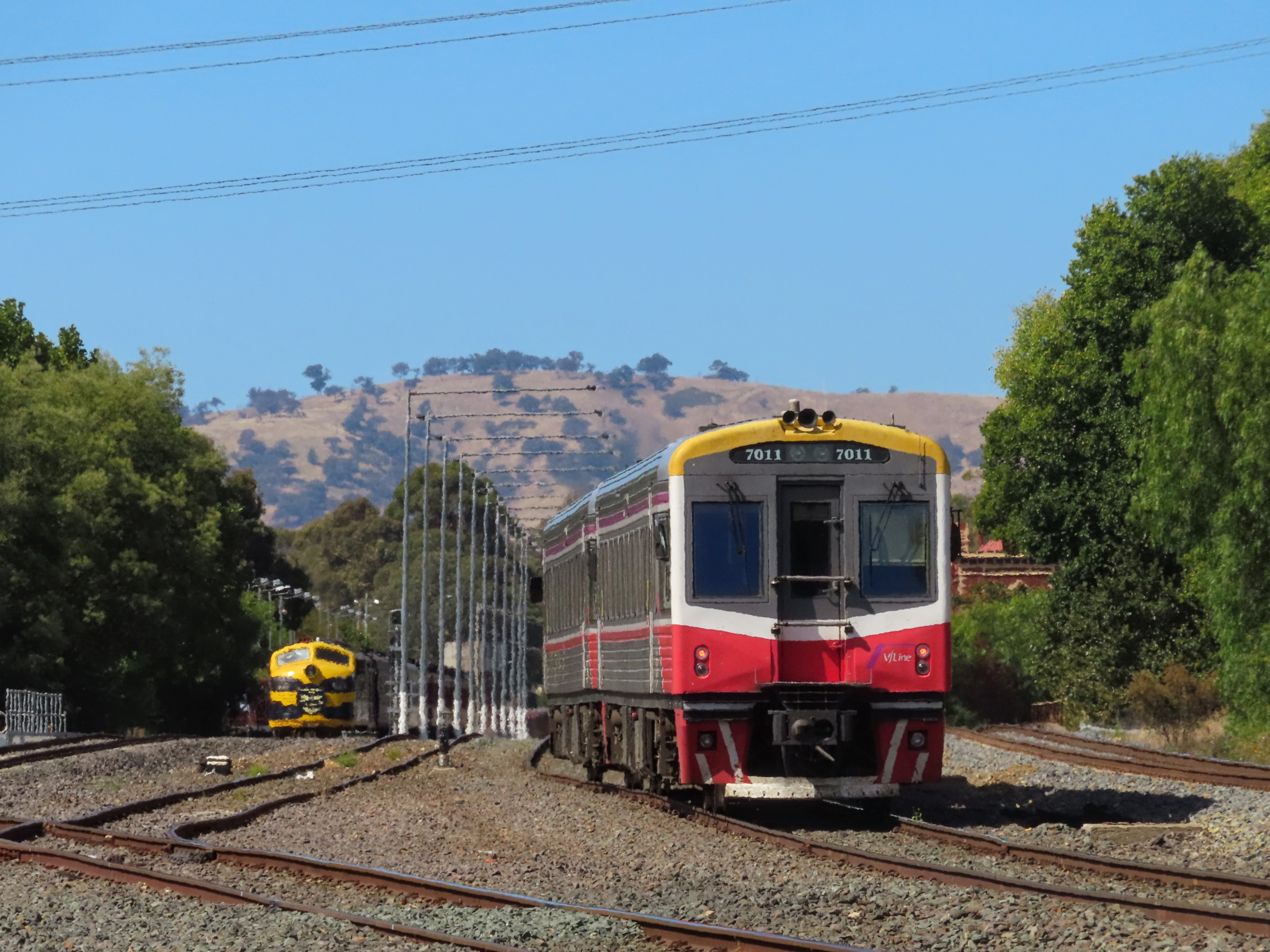
V/Line Sprinter arriving into Seymour

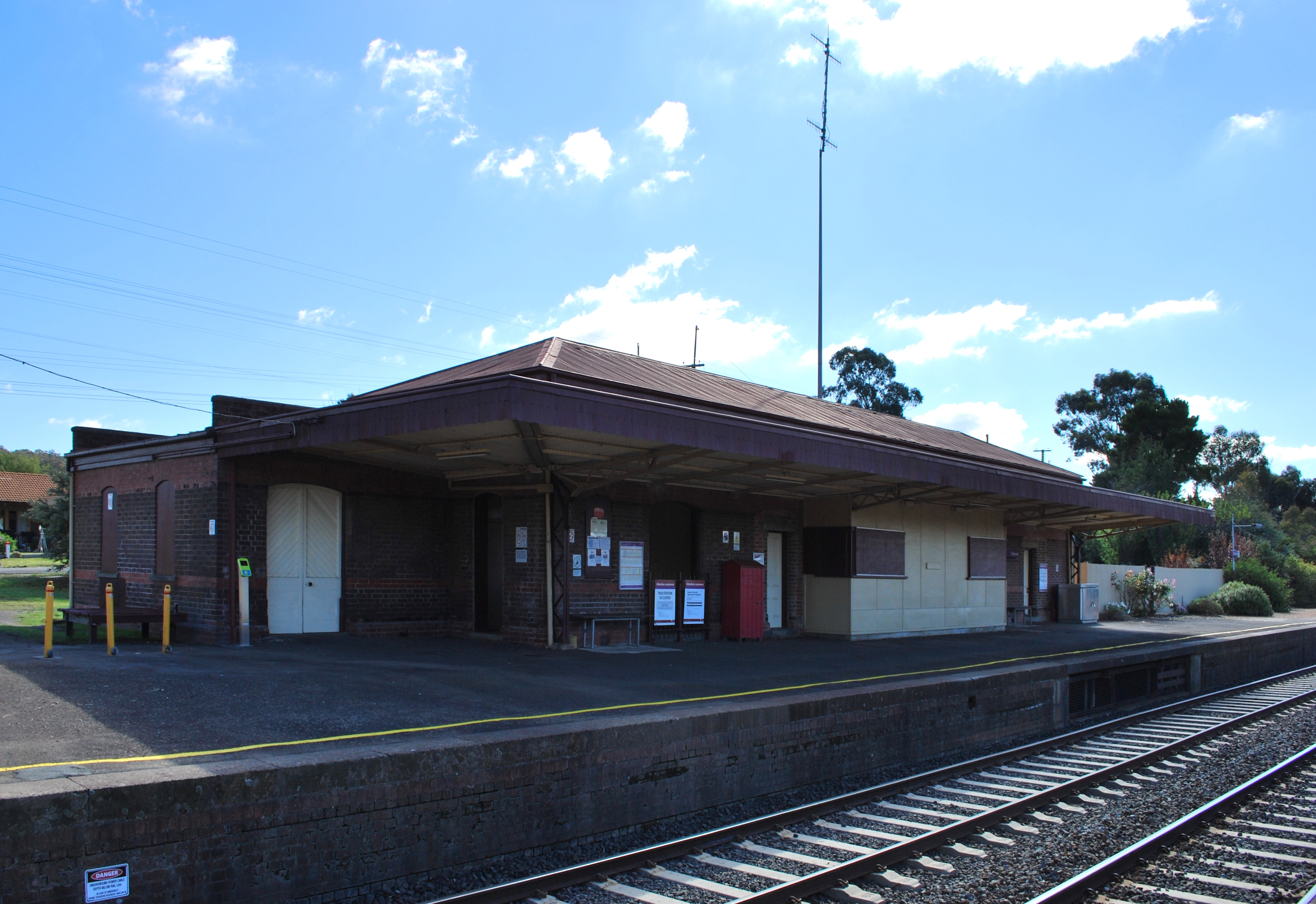
Tallarook railway station
