= Paolo Caccia Dominioni =

Italian officer

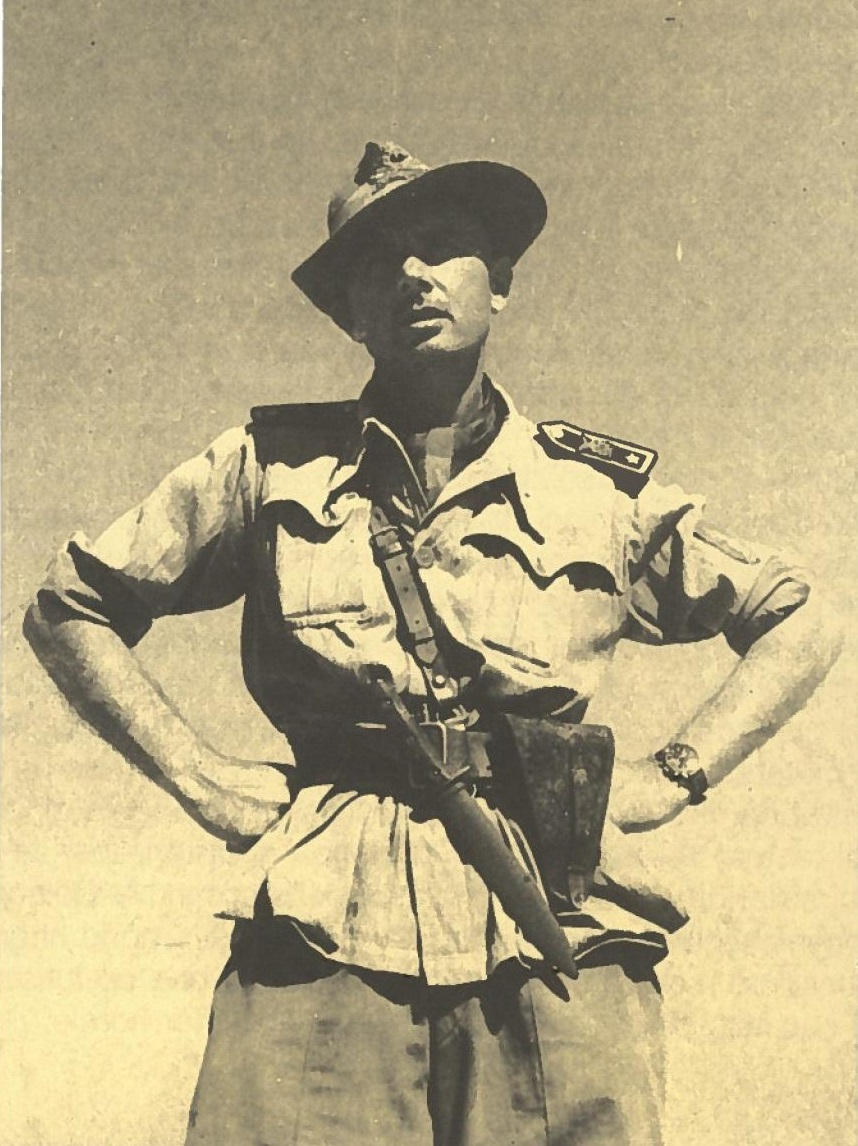
- Paolo Caccia Dominioni during World War II.
- Born: 14 May 1896; Nerviano, Kingdom of Italy
- Died: 12 August 1992 (aged 96); Rome, Italy
- Military career
- Allegiance: Kingdom of Italy
- Branch: Royal Italian Army
- Rank: Major
- Commands: XXXI Battaglione Guastatori d'Africa del Genio
- Conflicts: World War I; 10th Battle of the Isonzo; Second Italo-Ethiopian War; World War II; Axis capture of Tobruk; 1st Battle of El Alamein; 2nd Battle of El Alamein
- Awards: Gold Medal of Military Valour; Iron Cross 2nd Class

Paolo Caccia Dominioni, 14th Baron of Sillavengo (Italian: [ˈpaːolo ˈkattʃa domiˈnjoːni]; 14 May 1896 – 12 August 1992) was an Italian soldier, officer in the Alpini mountain Infantry Corps, engineer and writer, most noted for his leadership in the North Africa Campaign in World War II.

== Biography ==
Paolo Caccia Dominioni was born on 14 May 1896, in Nerviano, Milan, Kingdom of Italy. He was the son of Carlo (seventeenth count of Sillavengo; a diplomat) and Bianca (a marquise; maiden name, Cusani-Confalonieni).

In 1913 he entered the Faculty of Engineering at the Royal High Polytechnical School of Milan. In 1915, when Italy joined World War I, he registered as a volunteer. He fought in the Alpini Corps, where he was commissioned a first lieutenant. In February 1920, he re-entered the Polytechnical School. He earned his doctorate in Civil Engineering in 1922.

From 1924 onwards, Caccia Dominioni worked mainly abroad. During his engineer's career in prewar Egypt, he developed a deep friendship with the Belgian expatriate Vladimir Peniakoff, later to be known as Popski (the creator and leader of a World War II Special Forces unit called Popski's Private Army ("No 1 Demolition Squadron, PPA") with whom he had explored the Egyptian desert; a few years later the two friends would be facing each other as enemies, in Libya, in World War II. In 1931, Caccia Dominioni undertook a topographical survey of Tripolitania and in 1935 he led a reconnaissance campaign in Sudan.

In 1935–6 Caccia Dominioni fought in the Second Italo-Ethiopian War. At the outbreak of World War II he was first assigned to Military Intelligence (Servizio Informazioni Militare). In June 1942 he was given command of the XXXI Sappers Battalion, which he commanded during the First Battle of El Alamein, the Battle of Alam el Halfa, and the Second Battle of El Alamein. Field Marshall Erwin Rommel personally awarded him the Iron Cross, 2nd Class for his actions during the First Battle of El Alamein.

After the Armistice of Cassibile he joined the Italian resistance movement. In July 1944 he was arrested by the National Republican Guard, but released shortly afterward. His book on the Italian Campaign in North Africa, Alamein 1933–1962, was translated into English and published by Allen & Unwin in 1966 as Alamein 1933–1962: An Italian Story.

On 7 May 1958, Caccia Dominioni married Elena Sciolette (an amateur archaeologist). They had two daughters: Bianca Ottavia and Anna Francesca.

Caccia Dominioni devoted his postwar career to the retrieving of soldiers' corpses still on the Alamein battlefield and to the design and construction of a cemetery and a memorial building, located on a particular spot on the Alamein battleground named "Hill 33" where – thanks to his twenty years of efforts – thousands of Italian, German and British unknown fallen soldiers, were eventually identified and received a proper burial.

Dominioni also designed the Italian National Ossario in Murchison, Australia. The ossario holds the remains of 130 Italian prisoners of war and interned civilians who died in while interned in Australia during World War II.

Caccia Dominioni was correspondent for the Italian newspaper Il Corriere della Sera (1931–61), and contributor to other Italian and French newspapers. He died on 12 August 1992, in Rome, Lazio, Italy.

== Works ==
- La fine del Carso. Alessandria d'Egitto: Tipografia A. Procaccia. 1928.
- Basta con questa guerra. Cairo d'Egitto: Stamperia Lencioni. 1931.
- Amhara. Chroniques de la Patrouille Astrale. Paris: Plon. 1937.
- Resurrezione e ardore di un cantiere in terra lontana. Ankara d'Anatolia, estate 1938-XVI. Milan: Rizzoli. 1938.
- Casa del perduto amore (1 ed.). Il Cairo: H. Urwand & fils. 1951.
- Alamein 1933-1962 (1 ed.). Milan: Longanesi. 1962. ISBN 8842536288.
- Ascari K7 (1 ed.). Milan: Longanesi. 1966.
- Le trecento ore a Nord di Qattara (anthology on the Battle of El Alamein), Longanesi, 1972.
- La frana del San Matteo. Saga in Mar Rosso, 1889-1890. Milan: Cavallotti. 1982.
- 1915-1919. Diario di guerra. Milan: Mursia. 1993. ISBN 978-88-425-3964-3.
- Takfir. Cronaca dell'ultima battaglia di El Alamein, tratta dal diario storico di un battaglione. Milan: Mursia. 1994. ISBN 978-88-425-3751-9.
- Amhara. Cronache della pattuglia astrale. Omaggio a Paolo Caccia Dominioni. Milan: Libreria Militare. 2006. ISBN 88-89660-01-5.
- Alpino alla macchia. Cronache di latitanza, 1943-1945 (2 ed.). Milan: Libreria Militare. 2010. ISBN 978-88-89660-11-9.
- Ambrogio Viviani, ed. (2018). Il ponte fantasma - Isonzo, maggio 1917. Magenta: Zeisciu. ISBN 978-8887405484.

== Works translated into English ==
- Alamein, 1933-1962: An Italian Story. Translated by Dennis Chamberlain. London: Allen & Unwin. 1966.

== Honors ==
Military decorations
Gold Medal of Military Valour
Silver Medal of Military Valor
Bronze Medal of Military Valor
War Cross of Military Valor
War Merit Cross
Commemorative Medal for the Italo-Austrian War 1915–1918
Commemorative Medal of the Unity of Italy
Allied Victory Medal
Iron Cross 2nd Class
Cross of Merit of the Federal Republic of Germany

== Bibliography ==
- Argentina, Feliciano (1985). Omaggio a Paolo Caccia Dominioni. Manduria: Tiemme.
- Un uomo: Paolo Caccia Dominioni. Rivista Militare. 1988.
- Stefanon, Gualtiero (1992). Paolo Caccia Dominioni di Sillavengo: il ricordo di un uomo. Rivista Militare.
- Giacomo Agrati; Claudio Rossetti, eds. (2002). Quelli della sabbia... Paolo Caccia Dominioni, El Alamein e altro della campagna in Africa settentrionale, 1940-1943. Nerviano: I.S.S.R.A.M.
- Migliaccio, Maria Concetta, "Caccia Dominioni, Paolo," in Ezio Godoli and Milva Giacomelli (eds.), Architetti e ingegneri italiani dal Levante al Maghreb, 1848-1945: repertorio biografico, bibliografico e archivistico, Florence: Maschietto Editore, 2005, p. 109‒113;
- Scaramuzzi, Armando, "The Egypt of Paolo Caccia Dominioni," in Ezio Godoli and Milva Giacomelli (eds.), Italian Architects and Engineers in Egypt from the Nineteenth to the Twentyfirst Century, Exhibition Catalogue (Alexandria, Biblioteca Alessandrina, 24 October-25 November 2008), Florence: Maschietto Editore, 2008, p. 184‒195;
- Scaramuzzi, Armando, "Le ‘Grand tour’ de Paolo Caccia Dominioni," in Silvia Finzi, Milva Giacomelli, Ezio Godoli and Ahmed Saadaoui (eds.), Architectures et architectes italiens au Maghreb: actes du colloque international tenu aux Archives nationales de Tunisie, Tunis, 10-12 décembre 2009, Florence: Polistampa, 2011 (Les chemins de l’architecture italienne dans le monde), p. 144‒149;
- Pallini, Cristina, "Architecture of Engineers: Paolo Caccia Dominioni before El Alamein (1924-1938)," in Milva Giacomelli, Ezio Godoli and Ulisse Tramonti (eds.) Italian Architectural and Artistic Heritage in Egypt. Documentation & Safeguard: proceedings of the first international seminar, Cairo, Italian Culture Institute, November 28th, 2015, Alexandria, El Horya Ibedaa Center, November 30th, December 1st, 2015, Arcidosso (Grosseto): Effigi Edizioni, 2017 (Italian architectural and artistic heritage in mediterranean countries. Documentation and preservation), p. 199‒217.
