= Victorian Railways miscellaneous vehicles =

Miscellaneous rolling stock of Victorian Railways

Miscellaneous vehicles
- Operators: Victorian Railways
- Lines served: All

Specifications
- Track gauge: 1600 mm (5 ft 3 in)

This article contains information on Victorian Railways rolling stock that do not fit into other categories. These were for the most part "one-offs"; many were not classified.

== Hospital car ==
After a collision at Sunshine in 1908, in which more than 440 people were killed or injured, the Victorian Railways decided to construct two hospital cars, to look after patients injured in a possible repeat of the incident.

The two cars were converted from second class passenger cars, B328 and B343, which had previously been A138 and A153. Both cars dated from 1883. They entered service in 1909, fitted with water, stretchers, rest beds and medical supplies.

The first car was scrapped in 1940, the second in 1939.

== Road vehicles converted to rail use ==
=== Motor cars altered for rail uses ===
==== Petrol inspection car ====
This was a small car numbered '1' and named the inspection car. It was built in England in 1923, but was not listed in the 1936 stocktake.

==== Gang motor ====
The eight-horsepower gang motor, conveying five people, was built at Arden Street in late 1923. In 1950 the vehicle was removed from the rolling stock register and given to the Way and Works Department as a track motor.

==== Motor car ====
The Motor car entered service in mid 1925 after being fitted with rail wheels in lieu of tyres. In 1927 the car was named "Mr Molomby's inspection car", and allocated to Seymour. It was scrapped in 1952.

==== Dodge cars ====
In 1936 and 1937, six Dodge cars, with bodies built under licence by T.J. Richards & Sons in Adelaide, were fitted with rail wheels. Although officially described as "passenger and mail motors", they were put in the rail motor group and classified RM, with the numbers 70 to 75.

They were used on five branch lines with little traffic: Maryborough - Ararat, Horsham - Goroke, Birregurra - Forest, Murchison East - Girgarre (alternatively Colbinabbin) and Shepparton - Katamatite. One vehicle was kept spare as a replacement when a car in service required maintenance. To increase the mail and parcel-carrying capacity, four small 10-foot (3 m)-long trailers were built and used as required.

After being replaced by Walker railmotors in the early 1950s, they became inspection cars for railway officials. They were sold for scrap between 1953 and 1958, but one car, RM 74, was preserved and was placed in the Newport Railway Museum. In 1997, it was moved to the Daylesford Spa Country Railway, where it is undergoing restoration.

=== Road-transferable locomotive ===
In about 1991, it was realised that running long freight trains was no longer economical, given the shift to road transport that had been taking place for nearly 40 years. As a proposed solution, it was decided to purchase a road-transferable locomotive, essentially a truck fitted with retractable rail wheels. The truck was intended to haul short trains from three to perhaps fifteen wagons instead of deploying a large locomotive with far more power than necessary. The idea was that a number of wagons of the given type would be left in a rail siding and the line would be shut off. When there was enough grain or other commodity, the Melbourne-based truck was to drive by road to where the wagons were stored, and haul them to the nearest level crossing for loading. Once this was done, the truck would haul its short train back to Melbourne, unload, return the wagons to their storage location, then return to Melbourne by road.

The scheme was intended to cut down on crews, because the road-transferable locomotive did not require crews to be stationed at remote locations; one or two crews would therefore be able to do the work of several more crews.

An order was placed for three vehicles, and RTL1 began tests in 1995 north of Bendigo. It was found that the truck was only able to haul a maximum of seven loaded bogie grain hopper wagons. Tyre failure became a constant problem, and so RTL2 and RTL3 were not built.

RTL1 has been converted back to a standard road vehicle.

== Steam shovels ==
In the early 1900s, the railways were beginning to invest in large infrastructure projects, which had been delayed considerably due to the 1890s depression. As a result, in 1907 and 1912 respectively, two steam shovels were built. There is no more information about the second shovel, but the first does have a detailed history.

Steam Shovel No.1 was used early in its life at the ballast pit at Mt. Ruse. During 1909 the shovel was constantly dismantled and moved to other locations, one example being Armadale, when the cutting was being constructed from South Yarra to Toorak during the quadruplication of the Caulfield line, to increase services to Frankston and Dandenong. Presumably the shovel was also used to dig out Camberwell station and parts of the Glen Waverley line. It is thought that this work was shared with shovels Ruston and Harmon owned by the construction branch.

During the shovel's use it was operated by a steam locomotive driver who was unfit for driving duties.

== Testing vehicles ==
=== Dynagraph car ===
This car had originally been built in 1858 as passenger car 69A. In 1880 it was fitted with a Woods hydraulic brake and 9 years later with a standard Westinghouse air brake. In 1890 the car was marked for departmental use (Note: A note in the 1904 Diagrams book indicated that its role was for conveyance ot state governors.) In 1896 the car was converted to the dynagraph car.

The dynagraph car was an early form of dynamometer car for testing tractive effort of locomotives. It was superseded by the larger dynamometer car of 1932 and scrapped in 1953.

=== Dynamometer car ===
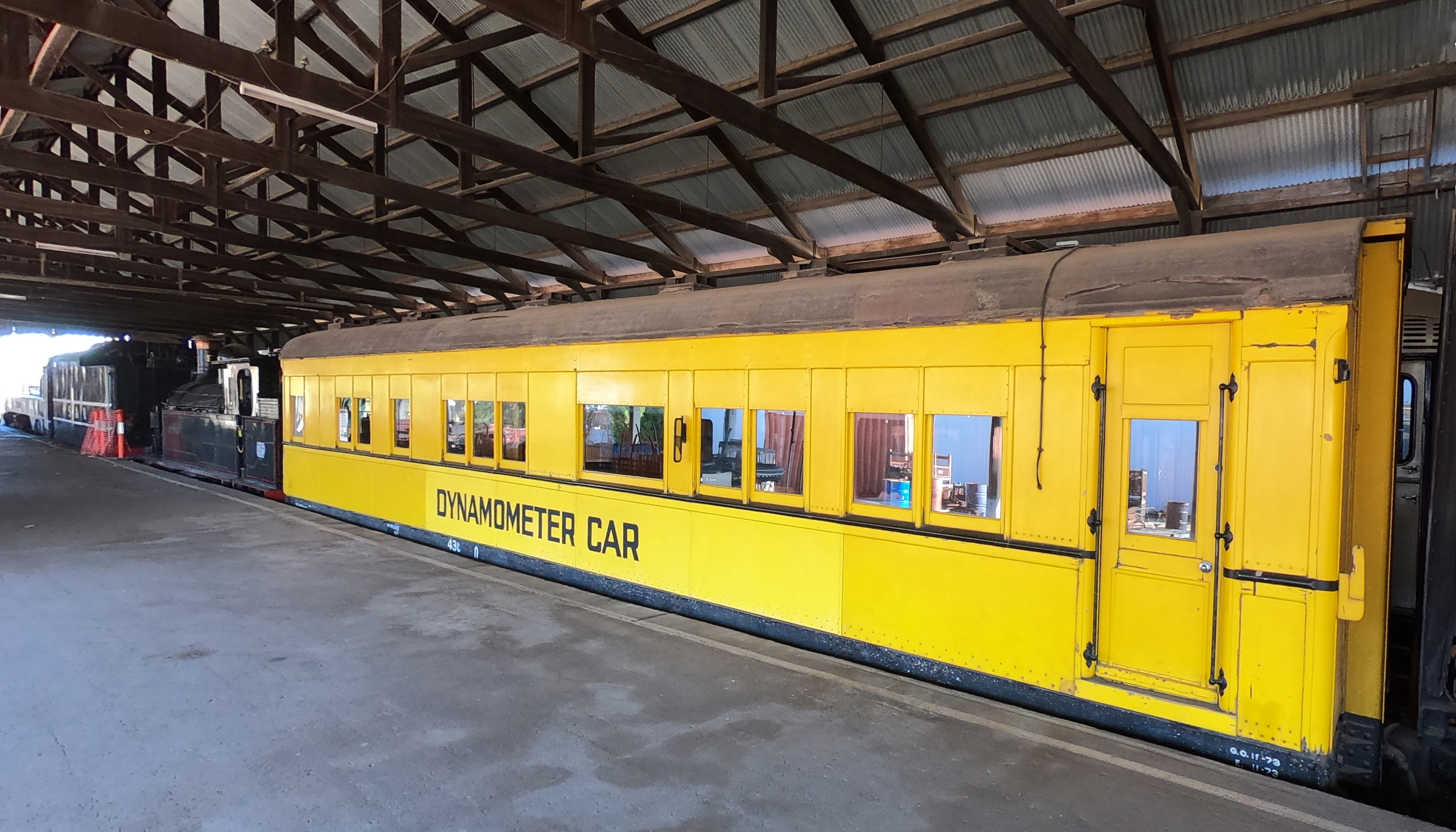
The dynamometer car at the National Railway Museum, Port Adelaide

By the late 1920s both the Victorian and South Australian railways had built much larger, more modern locomotives than those intended to be tested by the 1896 dynagraph car. As a result, that car was replaced with a more modern dynamometer car, which provided much the same facilities but with equipment upgrades to withstand the much higher force generated by some of the South Australian Railways' new steam locomotives. The car entered service in 1932.

Almost immediately, the Victorian system used the car to test the differences in rolling resistances between trains of four-wheeled wagons and the new bogie vehicles acquired in the late 1920s. Some of this rolling stock – for example, the E open wagons – had cousins in the SAR system of a similar if not identical design.

Tests were also run on the S class passenger locomotives. Included in the tests were tractive effort trials with loaded freight trains.

Other miscellaneous tests included suburban trials between Tait trains and the new Harris trains to service in the mid 1950s.

From 1932 to the 1970s, more than 900 tests were logged.

Some of the last runs in Victoria were used to test radio reception for the installation of "train-to-base" radio and Alternative Safe Working, a radio-based safe-working system.

== Unclassed wagons ==
=== Workshops oil transfer wagon ===
Within the Victorian Railways there were some wagons which stayed within workshop compounds, and so were never taken out onto the mainline. Usually these wagons were conversions from "scrapped" wagons, and for the most part were un-numbered. There was one wagon which was unlike any others, recorded as the "Workshops Oil Transfer" wagon. It seems to have been in regular 'mainline' use between Ballarat and Newport. By 1975 it was stored at the latter, and it may still be there today.

=== Pintsch gas refuse ===
In 1933, wagon WT7 was converted to a "coal fuel tank". Some time in the next six years the classification was altered to "fuel oil truck;', still retaining the number 7. In 1939 it was converted for a third time, for "Pintsch gas refuse" – the residue from conversions of shale oil to Pintsch oil, which was used for lamps. The wagon had a capacity of 2000 gallons (9000 litres). It was not recorded after 1939s.
