= Marion (Bill) Edwards =

Australian transsexual

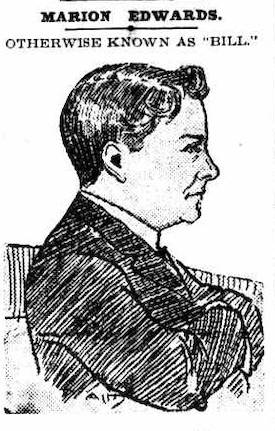
- Born: March 19, 1874; Murchison, Victoria, Australia
- Died: March 22, 1956 (aged 82); Royal Melbourne Hospital
- Known for: "Australia's first transgender celebrity"
- Spouse: Lucy Minihan (born Repacholi)

Marion (Bill) Edwards aka William Ernest Edwards (19 March 1874 – 22 March 1956) was an Australian transsexual who worked as a barman, pony trainer and bookmaker. Edwards has been described as "Australia's first transgender celebrity".

== Biography ==
Edwards was said to be born in Wales. but the ADB biography records the birth as being in Murchison in Victoria in 1874.

Edwards went through a marriage ceremony at St Francis' Church, the oldest Catholic church in Melbourne on the millennial New Years Day in 1900. The bride was Lucy Minihan whose birth name was Repacholi. Minihan was a 30 year old widow who owned a lodging-house. The couple separated but Lucy remained a friend. When Edwards was first arrested in 1905 suspected of a hotel burglary it was Lucy who found the £50 required to pay the bail. Edwards however ignored the obligation to appear in court and went to Queensland, so it was Lucy who was sentenced to a month in jail.

In 1906 Edwards came to notice after "William Edwards" was arrested again. Edwards was accused of burglary. The arresting officer Constable Donnely had known Edwards for some time as a man who worked at a local bar. Donnelly was later told that the person he had arrested was a woman. The charges were later dismissed. Edwards was profiled in a Brisbane weekly newspaper in October 1907.

Edwards wrote a biography that was designed to sell as it was partly fiction. The book was titled Life and Adventures of Marion-Bill-Edwards, the most celebrated Man-Woman of Modern Times. Exciting Incidents… Strange Sensations told in a Graphic Manner by Herself. and it included photographs of Edwards wearing men's and women's clothing. The book was published in 1907.

Edwards was profiled by the media, continuing the idea of a birth in Wales. Edwards explained that one of the reasons for dressing as a man was that women generally earned a pound a week and as a man Edwards earned over two.

== Death and legacy ==
Edwards died in 1956 in the Royal Melbourne Hospital. Edwards' final years were in the Mount Royal Geriatric Home. Edwards was not allowed to wear male attire there. In 2020 ABC made a radio programme entitled "Meet Australia's first transgender celebrity".
