= First Battle of El Alamein =

Battle of World War II

- Part of the Western Desert campaign of World War II
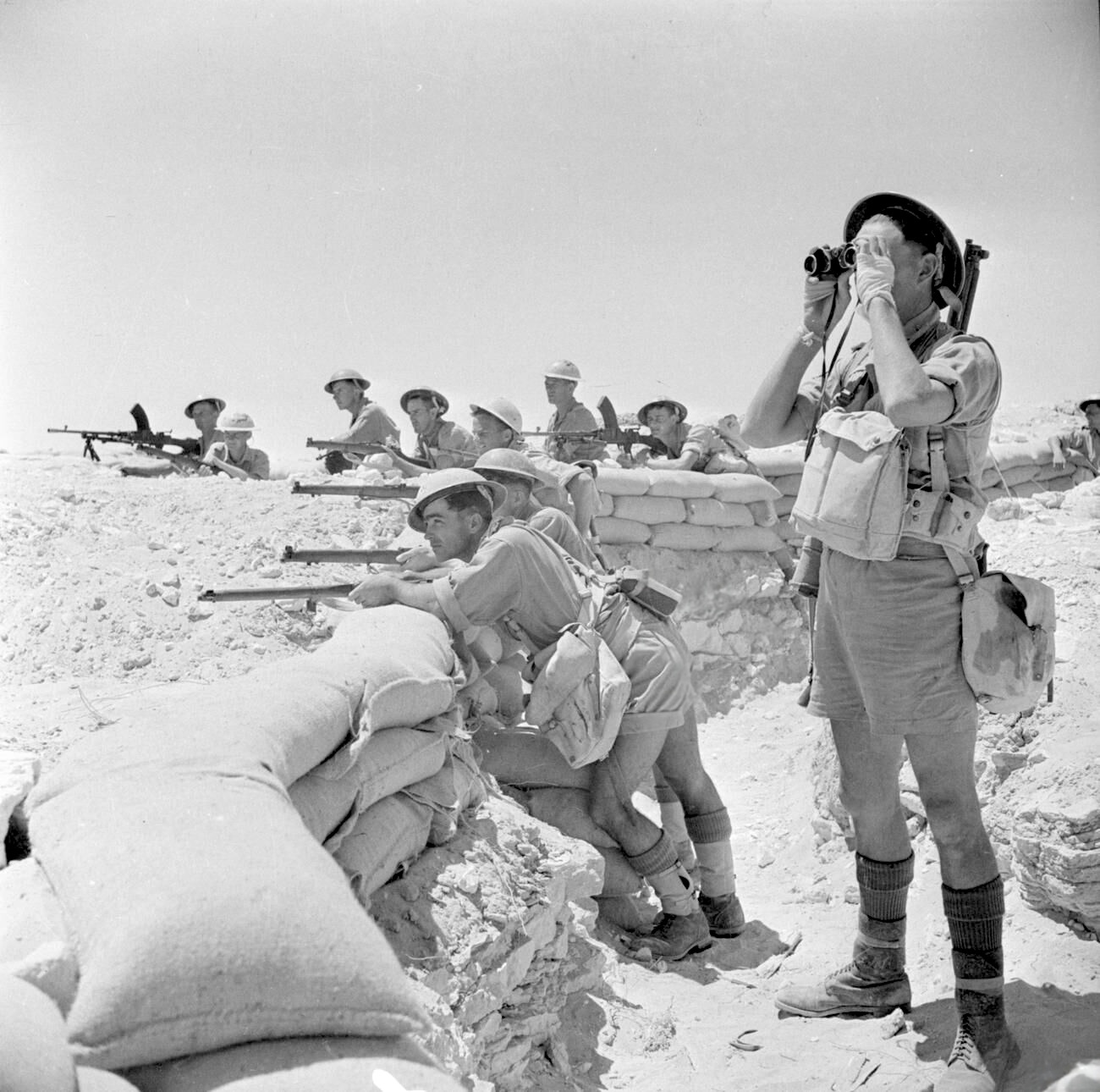
- British infantry manning a sandbagged defensive position near El Alamein, 17 July 1942
Date	1–27 July 1942
Location	El Alamein, British-occupied Egypt 30°50′29″N 28°56′34″E
Result	Stalemate

Belligerents
Italy (Nazi Germany) Germany	United Kingdom: Egypt; (British Raj) India; New Zealand; Australia (Union of South Africa) South Africa

Commanders and leaders
(Kingdom of Italy) Ettore Bastico (Nazi Germany) Erwin Rommel (Nazi Germany) Walther Nehring (Kingdom of Italy) Giuseppe De Stefanis (Kingdom of Italy) Enea Navarini (Kingdom of Italy) Benvenuto Gioda	(United Kingdom) Claude Auchinleck (United Kingdom) William Ramsden (United Kingdom) William Gott (United Kingdom) William Holmes

Strength
96,000 troops (56,000 Italian, 40,000 German); 70 tanks initially (585 tanks later) (Note: Reported strength on 30 June (55 German and 15 Italian tanks). An unknown number of tanks were also in repair workshops behind the front.); ~500 planes	150,000 troops 179 tanks initially (1,114 tanks later) (Note: Strength at the frontline on 1 July. In addition 902 tanks were in repair workshops behind the front, of which 34 were serviceable and many unrepairable.); 1,000+ artillery pieces 1,500+ planes

Casualties and losses
10,000 killed or wounded 7,000 prisoners	13,250 killed or wounded

The First Battle of El Alamein (1–27 July 1942) was a battle of the Western Desert campaign of World War II, fought in Egypt between Axis (German and Italian) forces of the Panzer Army Africa—which included the Afrika Korps under Field Marshal Erwin Rommel—and Allied (British Empire and Commonwealth) forces of the Eighth Army under General Claude Auchinleck.

In this battle the British halted a second advance by the Axis forces into Egypt. Axis positions near El Alamein, only 106 km (66 mi) from Alexandria, were dangerously close to the ports and cities of Egypt, the base facilities of the Commonwealth forces and the Suez Canal. However, the Axis forces were too far from their base at Tripoli in Libya to remain at El Alamein indefinitely, which led both sides to accumulate supplies for more offensives, against the constraints of time and distance.

== Background ==
=== Retreat from Gazala ===
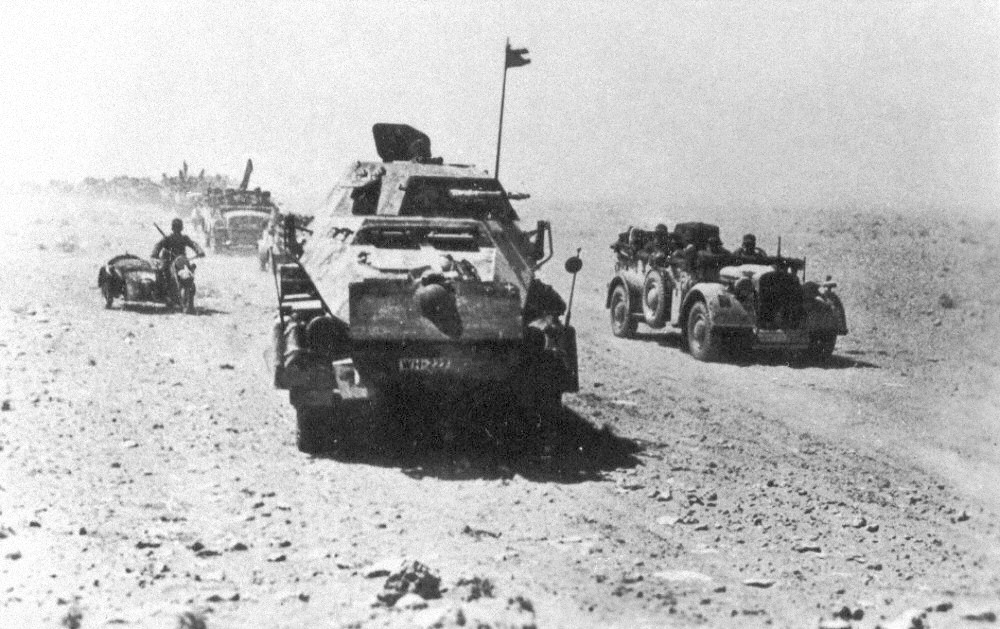
Afrika Korps tank hunters with an Sd.Kfz. 232 armoured car in front.

After their defeat at the Battle of Gazala in Eastern Libya in June 1942, the British Eighth Army, commanded by Lieutenant-General Neil Ritchie, had retreated east from the Gazala line into north-western Egypt as far as Mersa Matruh, roughly 160 km (99 mi) inside the border. Ritchie had decided not to hold the defences on the Egyptian border, because the defensive plan there was for infantry to hold defended localities and a strong armoured force behind them to meet any attempts to penetrate or outflank the fixed defences. Since General Ritchie had virtually no armoured units left fit to fight, the infantry positions would be defeated in detail. The Mersa defence plan also included an armoured reserve but in its absence Ritchie believed he could organise his infantry to cover the minefields between the defended localities to prevent Axis engineers from having undisturbed access.

To defend the Matruh line, Ritchie placed 10th Indian Infantry Division (in Matruh itself) and 50th (Northumbrian) Infantry Division (some 24 km (15 mi) down the coast at Gerawla) under X Corps HQ, newly arrived from Syria. Inland from X Corps would be XIII Corps with 5th Indian Infantry Division (with only one infantry brigade, 29th Indian, and two artillery regiments) around Sidi Hamza about 32 km (20 mi) inland, and the newly arrived 2nd New Zealand Division (short one brigade, the 6th, which had been left out of combat in case the division was captured and it would be needed to serve as the nucleus of a new division) at Minqar Qaim (on the escarpment 48 km (30 mi) inland) and 1st Armoured Division in the open desert to the south. The 1st Armoured Division had taken over 4th and 22nd Armoured Brigades from 7th Armoured Division which by this time had only three tank regiments (battalions) between them.

Area of Western Desert Campaign 1941–1942.

On 25 June, General Claude Auchinleck—Commander-in-Chief (C-in-C) Middle East Command—relieved Ritchie and assumed direct command of the Eighth Army himself. He decided not to seek a decisive confrontation at the Mersa Matruh position. He concluded that his inferiority in armour after the Gazala defeat, meant he would be unable to prevent Rommel either breaking through his centre or enveloping his open left flank to the south in the same way he had at Gazala. (Note: GHQ Cairo estimated that the Axis could have as many as 519 serviceable tanks on 30 June although 339 was a more probable figure. In fact the actual number on 26 June was 104 compared with 155 tanks in Eighth Army) He decided instead to employ delaying tactics while withdrawing a further 160 km (99 mi) or more east to a more defensible position near El Alamein on the Mediterranean coast. Only 64 km (40 mi) to the south of El Alamein, the steep slopes of the Qattara Depression ruled out the possibility of Axis armour moving around the southern flank of his defences and limited the width of the front he had to defend.

=== Battle of Mersa Matruh ===
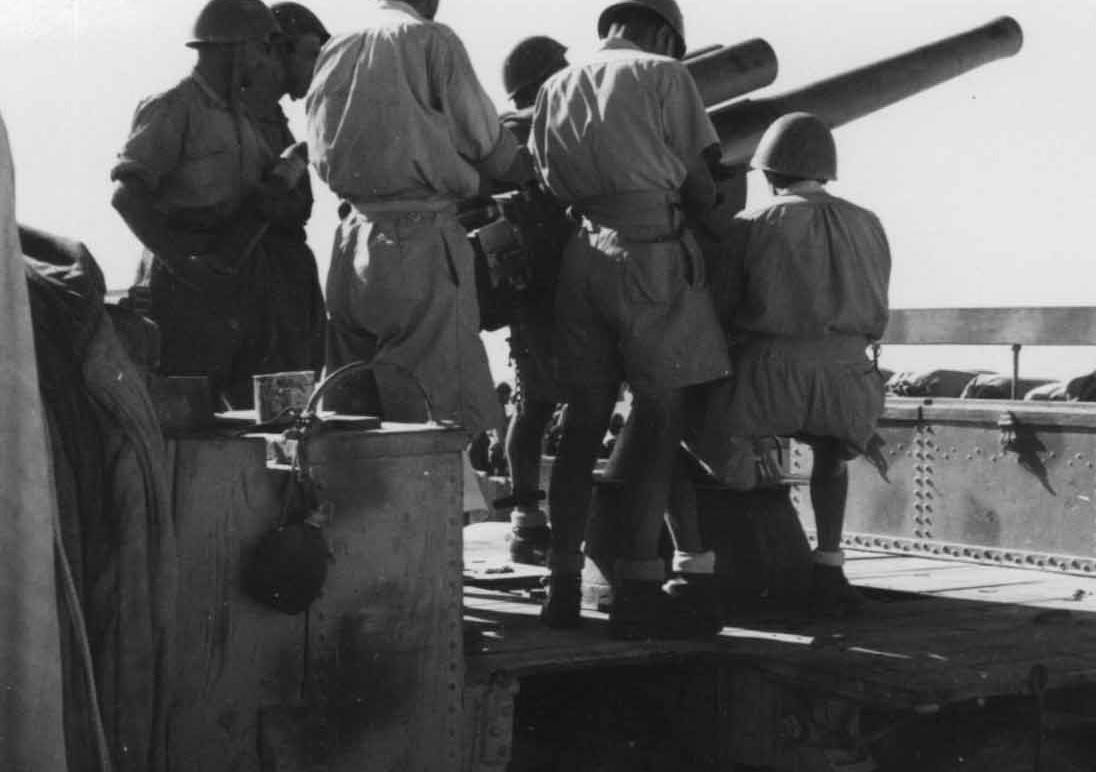
Italian anti-aircraft battery at Mersa Matrouh in June of 1942

While preparing the Alamein positions, Auchinleck fought strong delaying actions, first at Mersa Matruh on 26–27 June and then Fuka on 28 June. The late change of orders resulted in some confusion in the forward formations (X Corps and XIII Corps) between the desire to inflict damage on the enemy and the intention not to get trapped in the Matruh position but retreat in good order. The result was poor co-ordination between the two forward Corps and units within them. Late on 26 June, the German 90th Light and 21st Panzer Divisions managed to find their way through the minefields in the centre of the front. Early on 27 June, resuming its advance, the 90th Light was checked by British 50th Division's artillery. Meanwhile, the 15th and 21st Panzer Divisions advanced east above and below the escarpment. The 15th Panzer Division were blocked by 4th Armoured and 7th Motor Brigades, but the 21st Panzer Division were ordered on to attack Minqar Qaim. Rommel ordered 90th Light to resume its advance, requiring it to cut the coast road behind 50th Division by the evening. As the 21st Panzer Division moved on Minqar Qaim, the 2nd New Zealand Division found itself surrounded but broke out on the night of 27/28 June without serious losses and withdrew east.

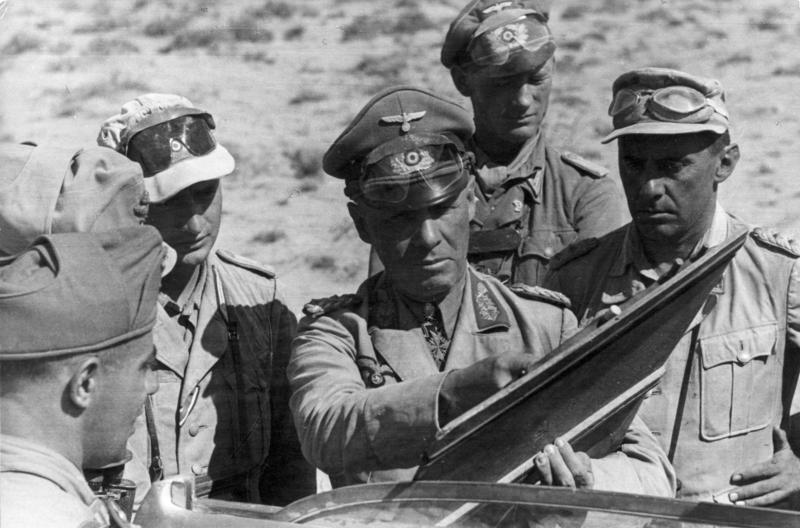
Rommel in North Africa (June 1942).

Auchinleck had planned a second delaying position at Fuka, some 30 mi (48 km) east of Matruh, and at 21:20 he issued the orders for a withdrawal to Fuka. Confusion in communication led the division withdrawing immediately to the El Alamein position. X Corps, having made an unsuccessful attempt to secure a position on the escarpment, were out of touch with Eighth Army from 19:30 until 04:30 the next morning. Only then did they discover that the withdrawal order had been given. The withdrawal of XIII Corps had left the southern flank of X Corps on the coast at Matruh exposed and their line of retreat compromised by the cutting of the coastal road 17 mi (27 km) east of Matruh. They were ordered to break out southwards into the desert and then make their way east. Auchinleck ordered XIII Corps to provide support but they were in no position to do so. At 21:00 on 28 June, X Corps—organised into brigade groups—headed south. In the darkness, there was considerable confusion as they came across enemy units laagered for the night. In the process, 5th Indian Division in particular sustained heavy casualties, including the destruction of the 29th Indian Infantry Brigade at Fuka. Axis forces captured more than 6,000 prisoners, in addition to 40 tanks and an enormous quantity of supplies.

== Prologue ==
=== Defences at El Alamein ===
The Western Desert Battle Area, July 1942.

Alamein itself was an inconsequential railway station on the coast. Some 10 mi (16 km) to the south lay the Ruweisat Ridge, a low stony prominence that gave excellent observation for many miles over the surrounding desert; 20 mi (32 km) to the south was the Qattara Depression. The line the British chose to defend stretched between the sea and the Depression, which meant that Rommel could outflank it only by taking a significant detour to the south and crossing the Sahara Desert. The British Army in Egypt recognised this before the war and had the Eighth Army begin construction of several "boxes" (localities with dug-outs and surrounded by minefields and barbed wire) the most developed being around the railway station at Alamein. Most of the "line" was open, empty desert. Lieutenant-General William Norrie (General officer commanding [GOC] XXX Corps) organised the position and started to construct three defended "boxes". The first and strongest, at El Alamein on the coast, had been partly wired and mined by 1st South African Division. The Bab el Qattara box—some 20 mi (32 km) from the coast and 8 mi (13 km) south-west of the Ruweisat Ridge—had been dug but had not been wired or mined, while at the Naq Abu Dweis box (on the edge of the Qattara Depression), 34 mi (55 km) from the coast, very little work had been done.

The British position in Egypt was desperate, the rout from Mersa Matruh had created a panic in the British headquarters at Cairo, something later called "the Flap". On what came to be referred to as "Ash Wednesday", at British headquarters, rear echelon units and the British Embassy, papers were hurriedly burned in anticipation of the fall of the city. Auchinleck—although believing he could stop Rommel at Alamein—felt he could not ignore the possibility that he might once more be outmanoeuvred or outfought. To maintain his army, plans must be made for the possibility of a further retreat whilst maintaining morale and retaining the support and co-operation of the Egyptians. Defensive positions were constructed west of Alexandria and on the approaches to Cairo while considerable areas in the Nile delta were flooded. The Axis, too, believed that the capture of Egypt was imminent; Italian leader Benito Mussolini—sensing a historic moment—flew to Libya to prepare for his triumphal entry into Cairo.

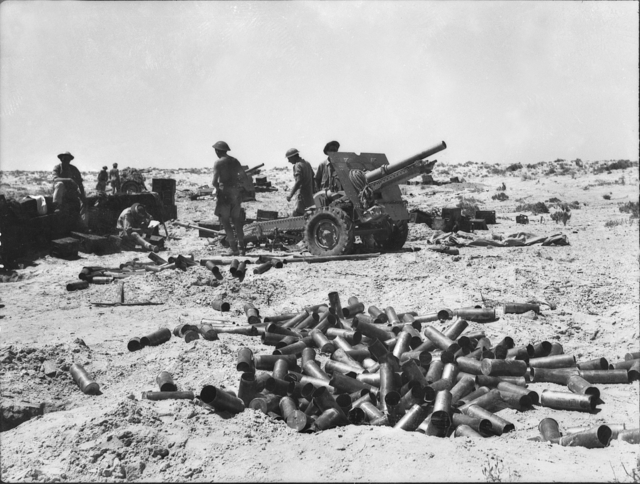
25 pdr guns of the 2/8th Field Regiment, Royal Australian Artillery at El Alamein, 12 July 1942.

The scattering of X Corps at Mersa Matruh disrupted Auchinleck's plan for occupying the Alamein defences. On 29 June, he ordered XXX Corps—the 1st South African, 5th and 10th Indian divisions—to take the coastal sector on the right of the front and XIII Corps—the 2nd New Zealand Division and 4th Indian divisions—to be on the left. The remains of the 1st Armoured Division and the 7th Armoured Division were to be held as a mobile army reserve. His intention was for the fixed defensive positions to channel and disorganise the enemy's advance while mobile units would attack their flanks and rear.

On 30 June, Rommel's Panzerarmee Afrika approached the Alamein position. The Axis forces were exhausted and understrength. Rommel had driven them forward ruthlessly, being confident that, provided he struck quickly before Eighth Army had time to settle, his momentum would take him through the Alamein position and he could then advance to the Nile with little further opposition. Supplies remained a problem because the Axis staff had originally expected a pause of six weeks after the capture of Tobruk. German air units were also exhausted and providing little help against the RAF's all-out attack on the Axis supply lines which, with the arrival of United States Army Air Forces (USAAF) heavy bombers, could reach as far as Benghazi. Although captured supplies proved useful, water and ammunition were constantly in short supply, while a shortage of transport impeded the distribution of the supplies that the Axis forces did have.

=== Axis plan of attack ===
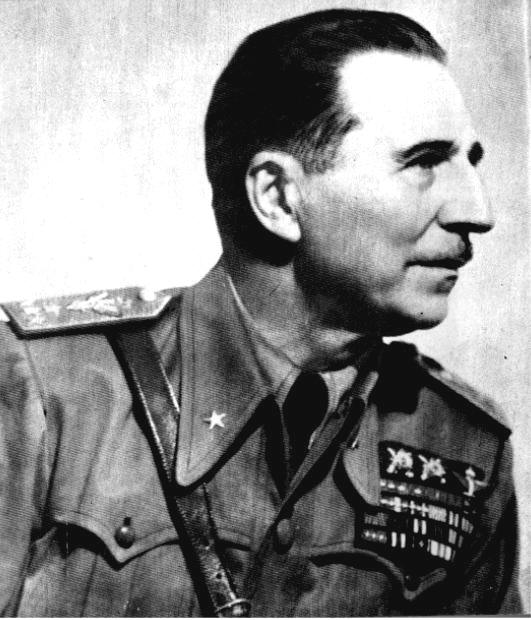
Marshal Ettore Bastico, Supreme Commander of Axis Forces in North Africa and Rommel's superior.

Rommel's plan was for the 90th Light Division and the 15th and 21st Panzer divisions of the Afrika Korps to penetrate the Eighth Army lines between the Alamein box and Deir el Abyad (which he believed was defended). The 90th Light Division was then to veer north to cut the coastal road and trap the defenders of the Alamein box (which Rommel thought was occupied by the remains of the 50th Infantry Division) and the Afrika Korps would veer right to attack the rear of XIII Corps.

== Battle ==
An Italian division was to attack the Alamein box from the west and another was to follow the 90th Light Division. The Italian XX Corps was to follow the Afrika Korps and deal with the Qattara box while the 133rd Armoured Division "Littorio" and German reconnaissance units would protect the right flank. Rommel had planned to attack on 30 June but supply and transport difficulties had resulted in a day's delay, vital to the defending forces reorganising on the Alamein line. On 30 June, the 90th Light Division was still 15 mi (24 km) short of its start line, 21st Panzer Division was immobilised through lack of fuel and the promised air support had yet to move into its advanced airfields.

=== Panzer Army Africa attacks ===
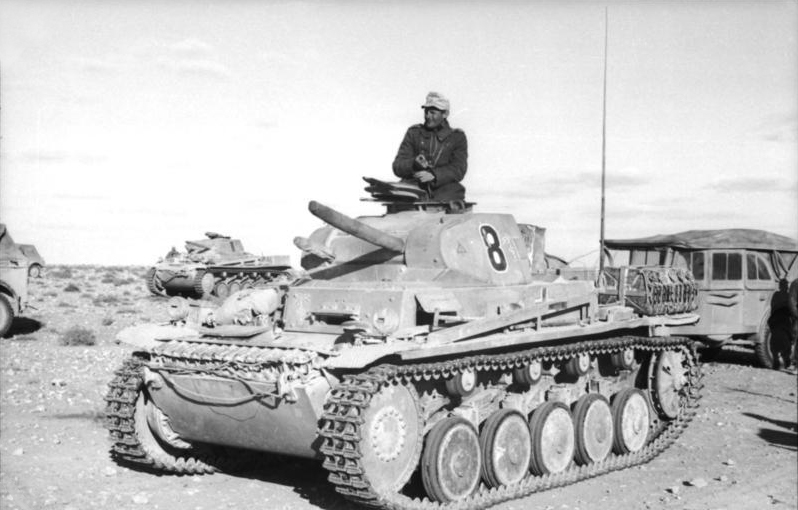
A Panzer II of the Afrika Korps.

At 03:00 on 1 July, 90th Light Infantry Division advanced east but strayed too far north and ran into the 1st South African Division's defences and became pinned down. The 15th and 21st Panzer Divisions of the Afrika Korps were delayed by a sandstorm and then a heavy air attack. It was broad daylight by the time they circled round the back of Deir el Abyad where they found the feature to the east of it occupied by 18th Indian Infantry Brigade which, after a hasty journey from Iraq, had occupied the exposed position just west of Ruweisat Ridge and east of Deir el Abyad at Deir el Shein late on 28 June to create one of Norrie's additional defensive boxes.

At about 10:00 on 1 July, 21st Panzer Division attacked Deir el Shein. 18th Indian Infantry Brigade—supported by 23 25-pounder gun-howitzers, 16 of the new 6-pounder anti-tank guns and nine Matilda tanks—held out the whole day in desperate fighting but by evening the Germans succeeded in over-running them. The time they bought allowed Auchinleck to organise the defence of the western end of Ruweisat Ridge. The 1st Armoured Division had been sent to intervene at Deir el Shein. They ran into 15th Panzer Division just south of Deir el Shein and drove it west. By the end of the day's fighting, the Afrika Korps had 37 tanks left out of its initial complement of 55.

During the early afternoon, 90th Light had extricated itself from the El Alamein box defences and resumed its move eastward. It came under artillery fire from the three South African brigade groups and was forced to dig in.

On 2 July, Rommel ordered the resumption of the offensive. Once again, 90th Light failed to make progress so Rommel called the Afrika Korps to abandon its planned sweep southward and instead join the effort to break through to the coast road by attacking east toward Ruweisat Ridge. The British defence of Ruweisat Ridge relied on an improvised formation called "Robcol", comprising a regiment each of field artillery and light anti-aircraft artillery and a company of infantry. Robcol—in line with normal British Army practice for ad hoc formations—was named after its commander, Brigadier Robert Waller, the Commander Royal Artillery of the 10th Indian Infantry Division. Robcol was able to buy time, and by late afternoon the two British armoured brigades joined the battle with 4th Armoured Brigade engaging the 15th Panzer Division, and 22nd Armoured Brigade the 21st Panzer Division respectively. They drove back repeated attacks by the Axis armour, who then withdrew before dusk. The British reinforced Ruweisat on the night of 2 July. The now enlarged Robcol became "Walgroup".

Meanwhile, the Royal Air Force (RAF) made heavy air attacks on the Axis units.

=== German advance halts ===
On the morning of 3 July, there was a sharp armoured exchange south of Ruweisat ridge, when Rommel ordered the Afrika Korps to resume its attack on the Ruweisat ridge with the Italian XX Motorised Corps on its southern flank, while the Italian X Corps, were to hold El Mreir. By this stage the Afrika Korps had only 26 operational tanks. To relieve the pressure on the right and centre of the Eighth Army line, XIII Corps on the left advanced from the Qattara box (known to the New Zealanders as the Kaponga box). The plan was that the New Zealand 2nd Division—with the remains of Indian 5th Division and 7th Motor Brigade under its command—would swing north to threaten the Axis flank and rear. This force encountered the Italian 132nd Armoured Division "Ariete"'s artillery, which was driving on the southern flank of the division as it attacked Ruweisat. The Italian commander ordered his battalions to fight their way out independently but the Ariete lost 531 men (about 350 were prisoners), 36 pieces of artillery, six (or eight?) tanks, and 55 trucks. By the end of the day, the Ariete Division had only five tanks.

The day ended once again with the Afrika Korps and Ariete losing to the superior numbers of the British 22nd Armoured and 4th Armoured Brigades, (Note: The two British armoured brigades started on 3 July with a total strength of 119 tanks) frustrating Rommel's attempts to resume his advance.

The RAF once again played its part, flying 900 sorties during the day. On 3 July, the RAF flew 780 sorties. (Note: During the period 1 to 27 June the Desert Air Force flew nearly 15,400 sorties. Auchinleck later wrote in his official despatches "...Our air forces could not have done more than they did to help and sustain the Eighth Army in its struggle. Their effort was continuous by day and night, and the effect on the enemy was tremendous. I am certain that, had it not been for their devoted and exceptional efforts, we should not have been able to stop the enemy on the El Alamein position.")

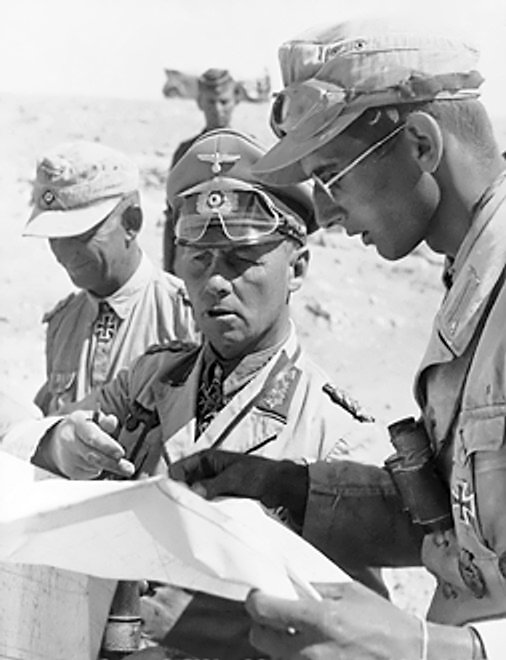
Field Marshal Erwin Rommel, with his aides during the desert campaign, 1942.

Major Peter Rainier, an engineer in the British Army, reported an incident from this battle on 4 July in his memoirs. Rainier states that the British activated an underground water pipeline, and filled it with seawater to test it. A large group of German soldiers tapped into this pipe and drank the water, not knowing it was seawater. They became sick relatively quickly, and surrendered to the British troops shortly after. This account from Rainier's memoirs was retold in some published articles.

On 4 July, the Australian 9th Division had entered the line in the north. To the south, on 5 July the New Zealand group resumed its advance northwards towards El Mreir intending to cut the rear of the Ariete Division. Heavy fire from the Italian 27th Infantry Division "Brescia" at El Mreir, however, 5 mi (8.0 km) north of the Qattara box, checked their progress and led XIII Corps to call off its attack. On 9 July the Indian 5th Infantry Brigade also returned, taking over the Ruweisat position. At the same time, the fresh Indian 161st Infantry Brigade reinforced the depleted Indian 5th Infantry Division.

On 4 July, Rommel decided his exhausted forces could make no further headway without resting and regrouping. He reported to the German High Command that his three German divisions numbered just 1,200–1,500 men each and resupply was proving highly problematic because of enemy interference from the air. He expected to have to remain on the defensive for at least two weeks. This point in the battle was later regarded as the last time that Egypt was threatened by Axis Forces.

Rommel was by this time suffering from the extended length of his supply lines. The Allied Desert Air Force (DAF) was concentrating fiercely on his fragile and elongated supply routes while British mobile columns moving west and striking from the south were causing havoc in the Axis rear echelons. Rommel could afford these losses even less since shipments from Italy had been substantially reduced (in June, he received 5,000 short tons (4,500 t) of supplies compared with 34,000 short tons (31,000 t) in May and 400 vehicles (compared with 2,000 in May). Meanwhile, the Eighth Army was reorganising and rebuilding, benefiting from its short lines of communication.

=== Tel el Eisa ===
On 8 July, Auchinleck ordered the new XXX Corps commander—Lieutenant-General William Ramsden—to capture the low ridges at Tel el Eisa and Tel el Makh Khad and then to push mobile battle groups south toward Deir el Shein and raiding parties west toward the airfields at El Daba. Meanwhile, XIII Corps would prevent the Axis from moving troops north to reinforce the coastal sector. Ramsden tasked the Australian 9th Division with 44th Royal Tank Regiment under command with the Tel el Eisa objective and the South African 1st Division with eight supporting tanks, Tel el Makh Khad. The raiding parties were to be provided by 1st Armoured Division.

Following a bombardment which started at 03:30 on 10 July, the Australian 26th Brigade launched an attack against the ridge north of Tel el Eisa station along the coast (Trig 33). The bombardment was the heaviest barrage yet experienced in North Africa, which created panic in the inexperienced soldiers of the Italian 60th Infantry Division "Sabratha" who had only just occupied inadequate defences in the sector. The Australian attack took more than 1,500 prisoners, routed an Italian Division and overran the German Signals Intercept Company 621. Meanwhile, the South Africans had by late morning taken Tel el Makh Khad and were in covering positions.

Elements of the German 164th Light Division and Italian 101st Motorised Division "Trieste" arrived to plug the gap torn in the Axis defences. That afternoon and evening, tanks from the German 15th Panzer and Italian Trieste Divisions launched counter-attacks against the Australian positions, the counter-attacks failing in the face of overwhelming Allied artillery and the Australian anti-tank guns.

At first light on 11 July, the Australian 2/24th Battalion supported by tanks from 44th Royal Tank Regiment attacked the western end of Tel el Eisa hill (Point 24). By early afternoon, the feature was captured and was then held against a series of Axis counter-attacks throughout the day. A small column of armour, motorised infantry, and guns then set off to raid Deir el Abyad and caused a battalion of Italian infantry to surrender. Its progress was checked at the Miteirya ridge and it was forced to withdraw that evening to the El Alamein box. During the day, more than 1,000 Italian prisoners were taken.

On 12 July, the 21st Panzer Division launched a counter-attack against Trig 33 and Point 24, which was beaten off after a 2½-hour fight, with more than 600 German dead and wounded left strewn in front of the Australian positions. The next day, the 21st Panzerdivision launched an attack against Point 33 and South African positions in the El Alamein box. In the El Alamein Box, the Royal Durban Light Infantry (RDLI) faced the full force of the German attacks. The RDLI did not have adequate anti-tank guns and the German artillery cut the South African telephone cables, disrupting their field artillery support. The attack was halted by intense artillery fire from the defenders. Although the South Africans repulsed the German attack, by 16:10, German tanks and dive bombers had advanced up to 300 metres from the South African positions. The 9th Australian field artillery, 7th British Medium Regiment had to assist in repulsing the German attack. At last light, the 79th British Anti-Tank Regiment was deployed to assist the South African forces, but the German attack was petering out. The South African losses on 13 July totalled nine dead and 42 wounded.

South African casualties were relatively light due to their skill in withstanding the German attacks. Had the El Alamein Box been captured by Rommel's forces, the consequences for the Eighth Army would have been devastating; the El Alamein line would have been ruptured, and Australian forces would have been cut off from the Eighth Army and forced into a general retreat to the Nile Delta. Rommel was still determined to drive the British forces from the northern salient. Although the Australian defenders had been forced back from Point 24, heavy casualties had been inflicted on 21st Panzer Division. Another attack was mounted on 15 July but made no ground against tenacious resistance. On 16 July, the Australians—supported by British tanks—launched an attack to try to take Point 24 but were forced back by German counter-attacks, suffering nearly fifty per cent casualties.

After seven days of fierce fighting, the battle in the north for the Tel el Eisa salient petered out. Australian 9th Division estimated at least 2,000 Axis troops had been killed and more than 3,700 prisoners of war taken in the battle. Possibly the most important feature of the battle, however, was that the Australians had captured Signals Intercept Company 621, which had been providing Rommel with priceless intelligence from British radio communications.

=== First Battle of Ruweisat Ridge ===
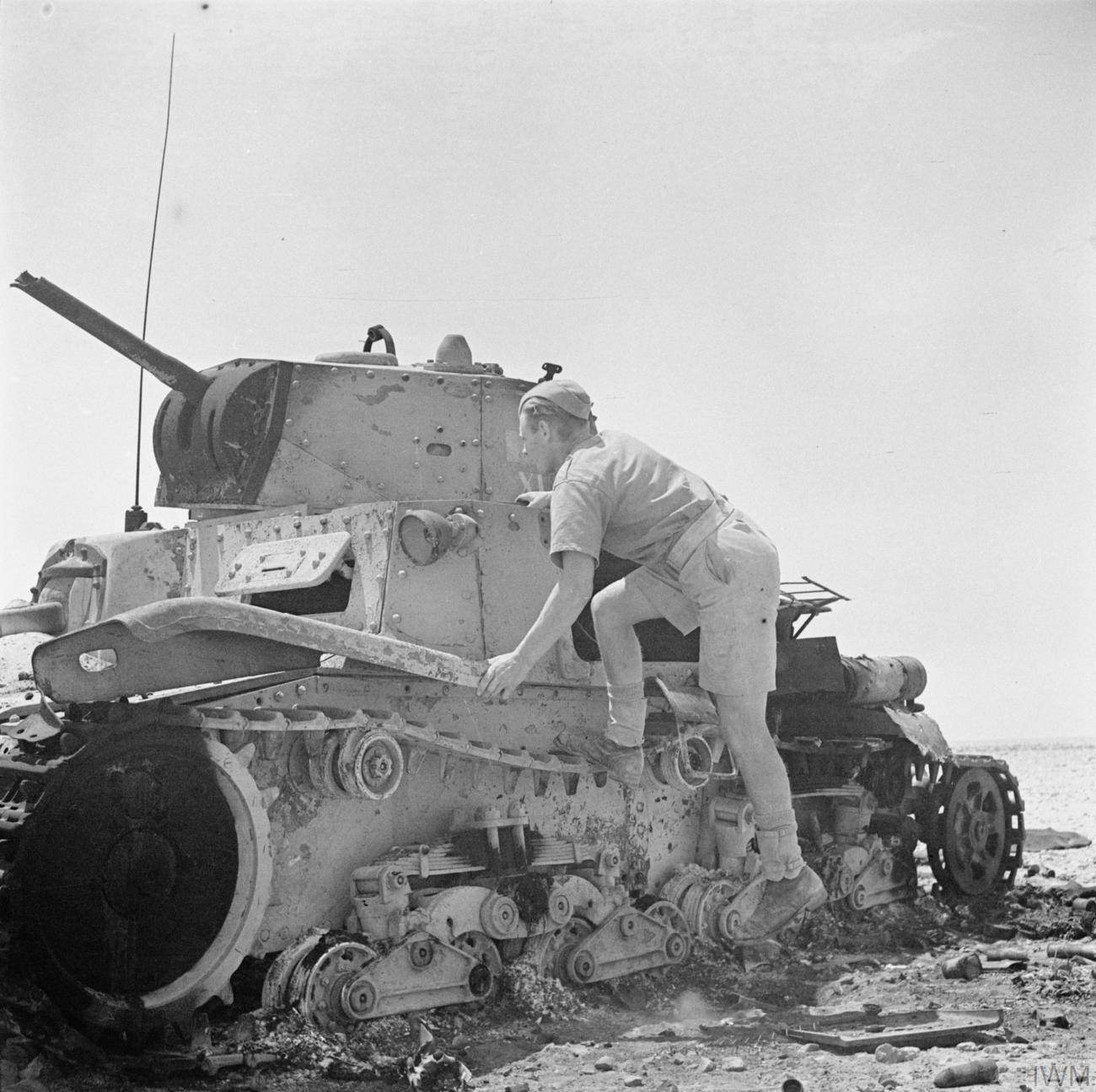
A soldier inspects an Italian M13/40 tank that was knocked out near El Alamein, 11 July 1942

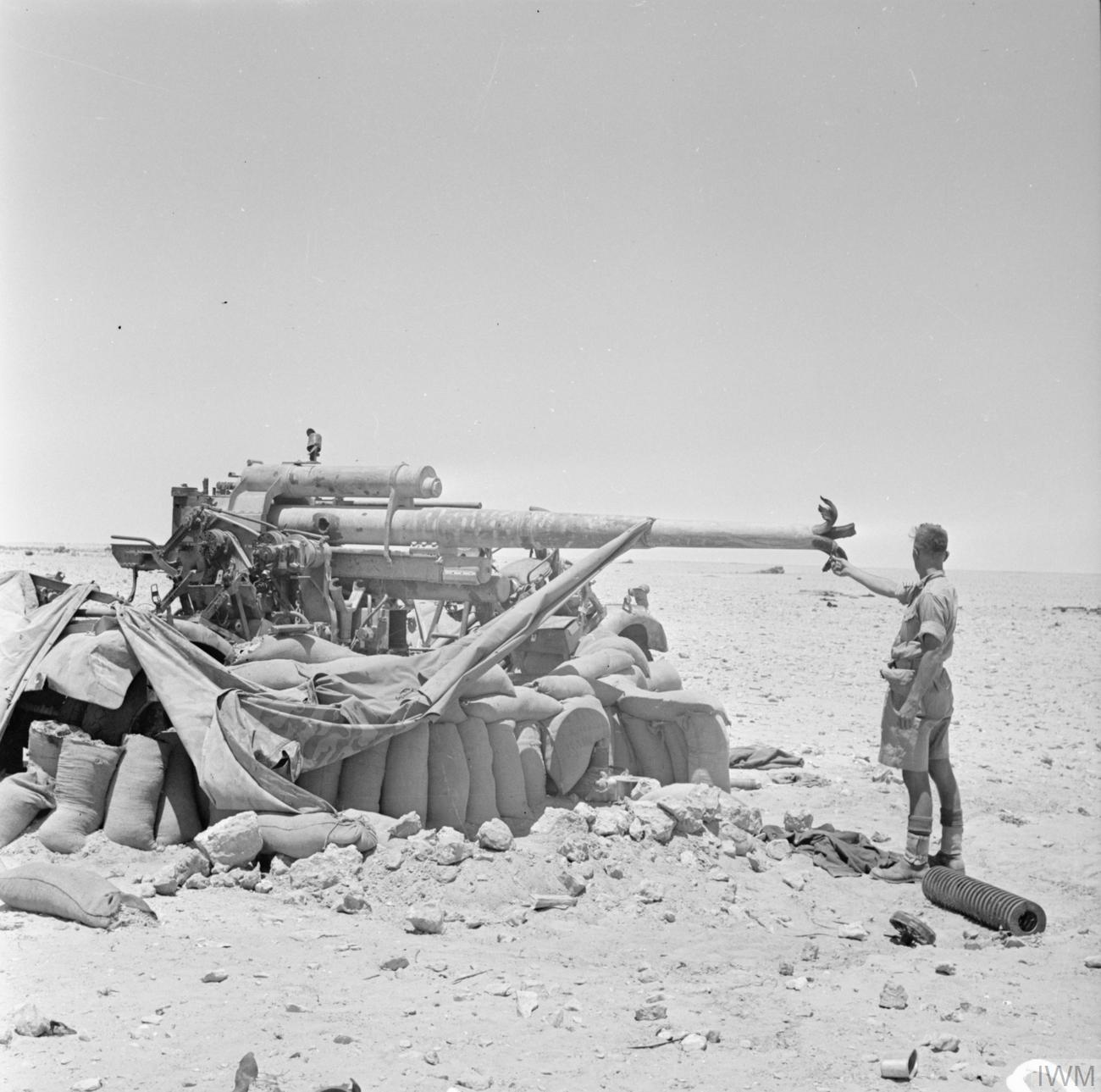
A German 88mm anti-tank gun captured and destroyed by New Zealand troops near El Alamein, 17 July 1942.

As the Axis forces dug in, Auchinleck—having drawn a number of German units to the coastal sector during the Tel el Eisa fighting—developed a plan codenamed Operation Bacon to attack the Italian 17th Infantry Division "Pavia" and Brescia Divisions in the centre of the front at the Ruweisat ridge. Signals intelligence was giving Auchinleck clear details of the Axis order of battle and force dispositions. His policy was to "...hit the Italians wherever possible in view of their low morale and because the Germans cannot hold extended fronts without them."

The intention was for the 4th New Zealand Brigade and 5th New Zealand Brigade (on 4th Brigade's right) to attack north-west to seize the western part of the ridge and on their right the Indian 5th Infantry Brigade to capture the eastern part of the ridge in a night attack. Then, the 2nd Armoured Brigade would pass through the centre of the infantry objectives to exploit toward Deir el Shein and the Miteirya Ridge. On the left, the 22nd Armoured Brigade would be ready to move forward to protect the infantry as they consolidated on the ridge.

The attack commenced at 23:00 on 14 July. Shortly before dawn on 15 July, the two New Zealand brigades took their objectives, but minefields and pockets of resistance left behind the forward troops' advance created disarray among the attackers, impeding the move forward of reserves, artillery, and support arms. As a result, the New Zealand brigades occupied exposed positions on the ridge without support weapons except for a few anti-tank guns. More significantly, the two British armoured brigades failed to move forward to protect the infantry. At first light, a detachment from the 15th Panzer Divisions, the 8th Panzer Regiment launched a counter-attack against New Zealand 4th Brigade's 22nd Battalion. A sharp exchange knocked out their anti-tank guns, and the infantry found themselves exposed in the open with no alternative but to surrender. Approximately 350 New Zealanders were taken prisoner.

While the 2nd New Zealand Division attacked the western slopes of Ruweisat Ridge, the Indian 5th Brigade made small gains on Ruweisat ridge to the east. By 07:00, word finally reached the 2nd Armoured Brigade, which started to move north west. Two regiments became embroiled in a minefield, but the third was able to join Indian 5th Infantry Brigade as it renewed its attack. With the help of the armour and artillery, the Indians were able to take their objectives by early afternoon. Meanwhile, the 22nd Armoured Brigade had been engaged at Alam Nayil by 90th Light Division and the Ariete Armoured Division, advancing from the south. While—with help from mobile infantry and artillery columns from 7th Armoured Division—they pushed back the Axis probe with ease, they were prevented from advancing north to protect the New Zealand flank.

Seeing the Brescia and Pavia under pressure, Rommel rushed German troops to Ruweisat. By 15:00, the 3rd Reconnaissance Regiment and part of 21st Panzer Division from the north and 33rd Reconnaissance Regiment and the Baade Group comprising elements from 15th Panzer Division from the south were in place under Lieutenant-General (General der Panzertruppe) Walther Nehring. At 17:00, Nehring launched his counter-attack. 4th New Zealand Brigade were still short of support weapons and also, by this time, ammunition. Once again, the anti-tank defences were overwhelmed and about 380 New Zealanders were taken prisoner including Captain Charles Upham who gained a second Victoria Cross for his actions, including destroying a German tank, several guns, and vehicles with grenades despite being shot through the elbow by a machine gun bullet. At about 18:00, the brigade HQ was overrun. At about 18:15, the 2nd Armoured Brigade engaged the German armour and halted the Axis eastward advance. At dusk, Nehring broke off the action.

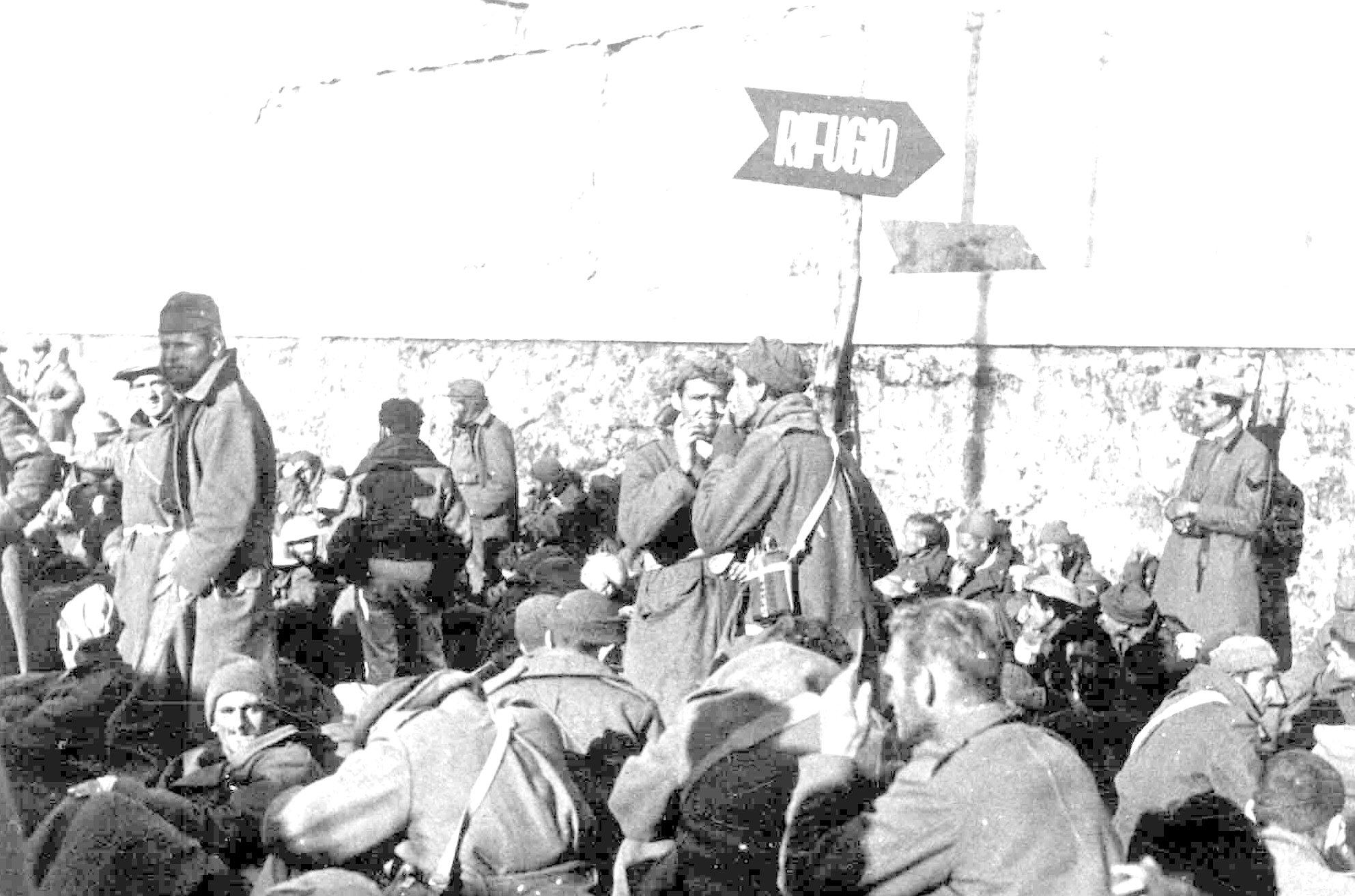
British, Australian and New Zealand POWs awaiting transport to the Italian mainland.

Early on 16 July, Nehring renewed his attack. The 5th Indian Infantry Brigade pushed them back, but it was clear from intercepted radio traffic that a further attempt would be made. Strenuous preparations to dig in anti-tank guns were made, artillery fire plans organised, and a regiment from the 22nd Armoured Brigade sent to reinforce the 2nd Armoured Brigade. When the attack resumed late in the afternoon, it was repulsed. After the battle, the Indians counted 24 knocked out tanks, as well as armoured cars and numerous anti-tank guns left on the battlefield. In three days' fighting, the Allies took more than 2,000 Axis prisoners, mostly from the Italian Brescia and Pavia Divisions; the New Zealand division suffered 1,405 casualties. The fighting at Tel el Eisa and Ruweisat had caused the destruction of three Italian divisions, forced Rommel to redeploy his armour from the south, and made it necessary to lay minefields in front of the remaining Italian divisions and stiffen them with detachments of German troops.

=== Miteirya Ridge (Ruin Ridge) ===
To relieve pressure on Ruweisat ridge, Auchinleck ordered the Australian 9th Division to make another attack from the north. In the early hours of 17 July, the Australian 24th Brigade—supported by 44th Royal Tank Regiment (RTR) and strong fighter cover from the air—assaulted Miteirya ridge (known as "Ruin ridge" to the Australians). The initial night attack went well, with 736 prisoners taken, mostly from the Italian Trento and Trieste motorised divisions. Once again, however, a critical situation for the Axis forces was retrieved by vigorous counter-attacks from hastily assembled German and Italian forces, which forced the Australians to withdraw back to their start line with 300 casualties. Although the Australian Official History of the 24th Brigade's 2/32nd Battalion describes the counter-attack force as "German", the Australian historian Mark Johnston reports that German records indicate that it was the Trento Division that overran the Australian battalion. (Note: Barton Maughan—Australia's official historian—has written that "two forward platoons of the 2/32nd's left company were overrun, 22 men were taken prisoner" but fails to shed more light on this attack.)

=== Second Battle of Ruweisat Ridge (El Mreir) ===
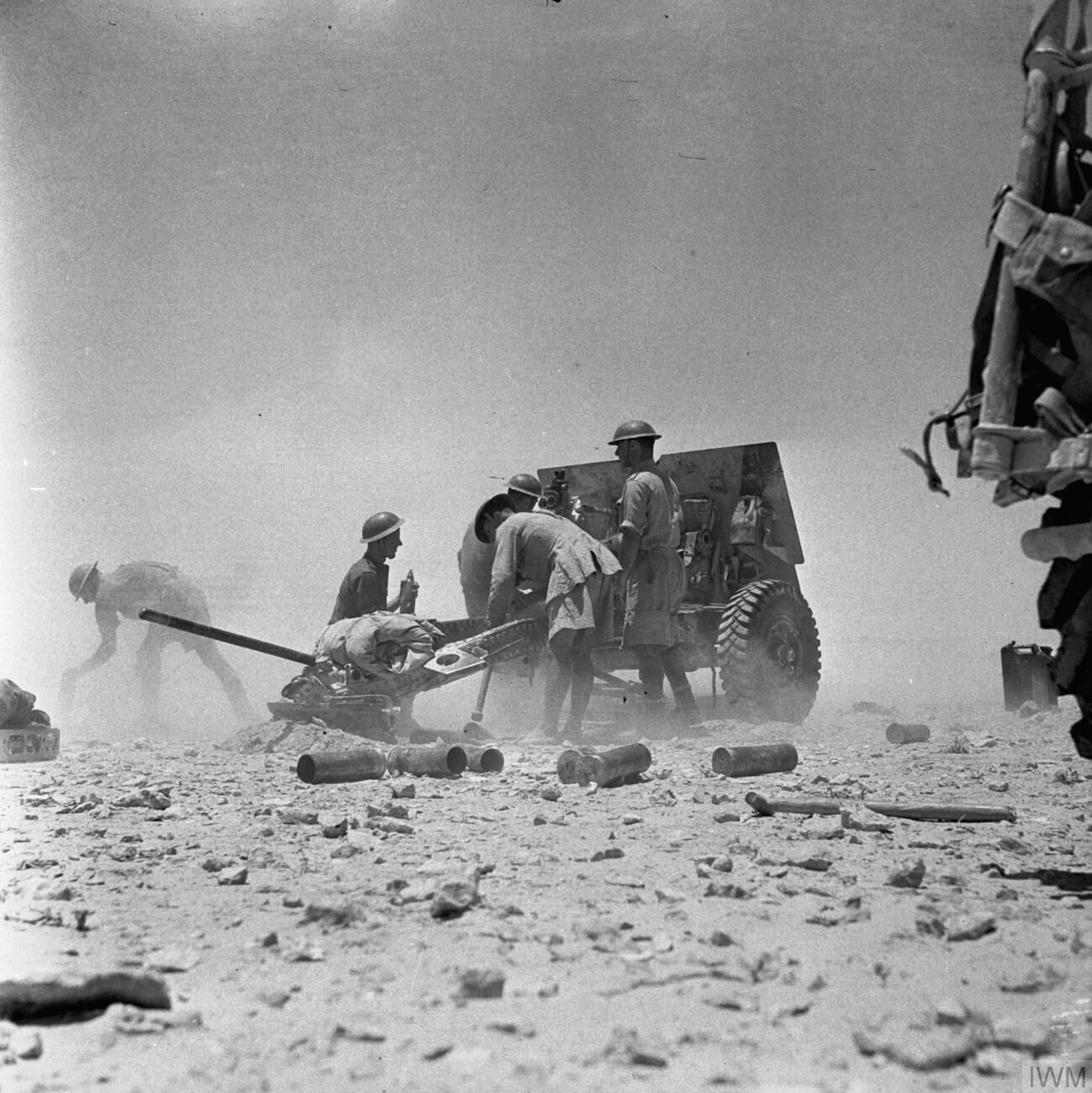
A 25-pdr field gun of 11th Field Regiment, Royal Artillery, in action, July 1942.

The Eighth Army now enjoyed a massive superiority in material over the Axis forces: 1st Armoured Division had 173 tanks and more in reserve or in transit, including 61 Grants while Rommel possessed only 38 German tanks and 51 Italian tanks although his armoured units had some 100 tanks awaiting repair.

Auchinleck's plan was for Indian Infantry 161st Brigade to attack along Ruweisat ridge to take Deir el Shein, while the New Zealand 6th Brigade attacked from south of the ridge to the El Mreir depression. At daylight, two British armoured brigades—2nd Armoured Brigade and the fresh 23rd Armoured Brigade—would sweep through the gap created by the infantry. The plan was complicated and ambitious.

The infantry night attack began at 16:30 on 21 July. The New Zealand attack took their objectives in the El Mreir depression but, once again, many vehicles failed to arrive and they were short of support arms in an exposed position. At daybreak on 22 July, the British armoured brigades again failed to advance. At daybreak on 22 July, Nehring's 5th and 8th Panzer Regiments responded with a rapid counter-attack which quickly overran the New Zealand infantry in the open, inflicting more than 900 casualties on the New Zealanders. 2nd Armoured Brigade sent forward two regiments to help but they were halted by mines and anti-tank fire.

The attack by Indian 161st Brigade had mixed fortunes. On the left, the initial attempt to clear the western end of Ruweisat failed but at 08:00 a renewed attack by the reserve battalion succeeded. On the right, the attacking battalion broke into the Deir el Shein position but was driven back in hand-to-hand fighting.

Compounding the disaster at El Mreir, at 08:00 the commander of 23rd Armoured Brigade ordered his brigade forward, intent on following his orders to the letter. Major-General Gatehouse—commanding 1st Armoured Division—had been unconvinced that a path had been adequately cleared in the minefields and had suggested the advance be cancelled. However, XIII Corps commander—Lieutenant-General William Gott—rejected this and ordered the attack but on a centre line 1 mi (1.6 km) south of the original plan which he incorrectly believed was mine-free. These orders failed to get through and the attack went ahead as originally planned. The brigade found itself mired in mine fields and under heavy fire. They were then counter-attacked by 21st Panzer at 11:00 and forced to withdraw. The 23rd Armoured Brigade was destroyed, with the loss of 40 tanks destroyed and 47 badly damaged.

At 17:00, Gott ordered 5th Indian Infantry Division to execute a night attack to capture the western half of Ruweisat ridge and Deir el Shein. 3/14th Punjab Regiment from 9th Indian Infantry Brigade attacked at 02:00 on 23 July but failed as they lost their direction. A further attempt in daylight succeeded in breaking into the position but intense fire from three sides resulted in control being lost as the commanding officer was killed, and four of his senior officers were wounded or went missing.

=== Attack on Tel el Eisa resumed ===
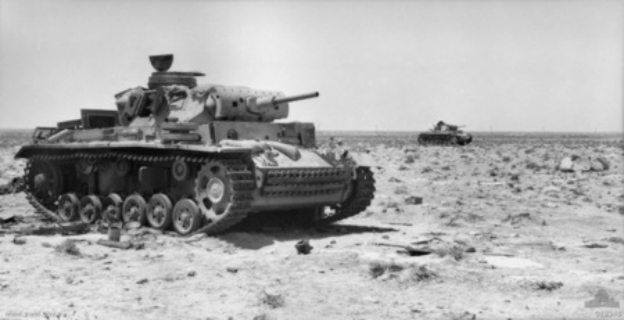
Destroyed Panzer IIIs near Tel el Eisa

To the north, Australian 9th Division continued its attacks. At 06:00 on 22 July, Australian 26th Brigade attacked Tel el Eisa and Australian 24th Brigade attacked Tel el Makh Khad toward Miteirya (Ruin Ridge). It was during this fighting that Arthur Stanley Gurney performed the actions for which he was posthumously awarded the Victoria Cross. The fighting for Tel el Eisa was costly, but by the afternoon the Australians controlled the feature. That evening, Australian 24th Brigade attacked Tel el Makh Khad with the tanks of 50th RTR in support. The tank unit had not been trained in close infantry support and failed to co-ordinate with the Australian infantry. The result was that the infantry and armour advanced independently and having reached the objective 50th RTR lost 23 tanks because they lacked infantry support.

Once more, the Eighth Army had failed to destroy Rommel's forces, despite its overwhelming superiority in men and equipment. On the other hand, for Rommel the situation continued to be grave as, despite successful defensive operations, his infantry had suffered heavy losses and he reported that "the situation is critical in the extreme".

==== Operation Manhood ====
On 26/27 July, Auchinleck launched Operation Manhood in the northern sector in a final attempt to break the Axis forces. XXX Corps was reinforced with 1st Armoured Division (less 22nd Armoured Brigade), 4th Light Armoured Brigade, and 69th Infantry Brigade. The plan was to break the enemy line south of Miteirya ridge and exploit north-west. The South Africans were to make and mark a gap in the minefields to the south-east of Miteirya by midnight of 26/27 July. By 01:00 on 27 July, 24th Australian Infantry Brigade was to have captured the eastern end of the Miteirya ridge and would exploit toward the north-west. The 69th Infantry Brigade would pass through the minefield gap created by the South Africans to Deir el Dhib and clear and mark gaps in further minefields. The 2nd Armoured Brigade would then pass through to El Wishka and would be followed by 4th Light Armoured Brigade which would attack the Axis lines of communication.

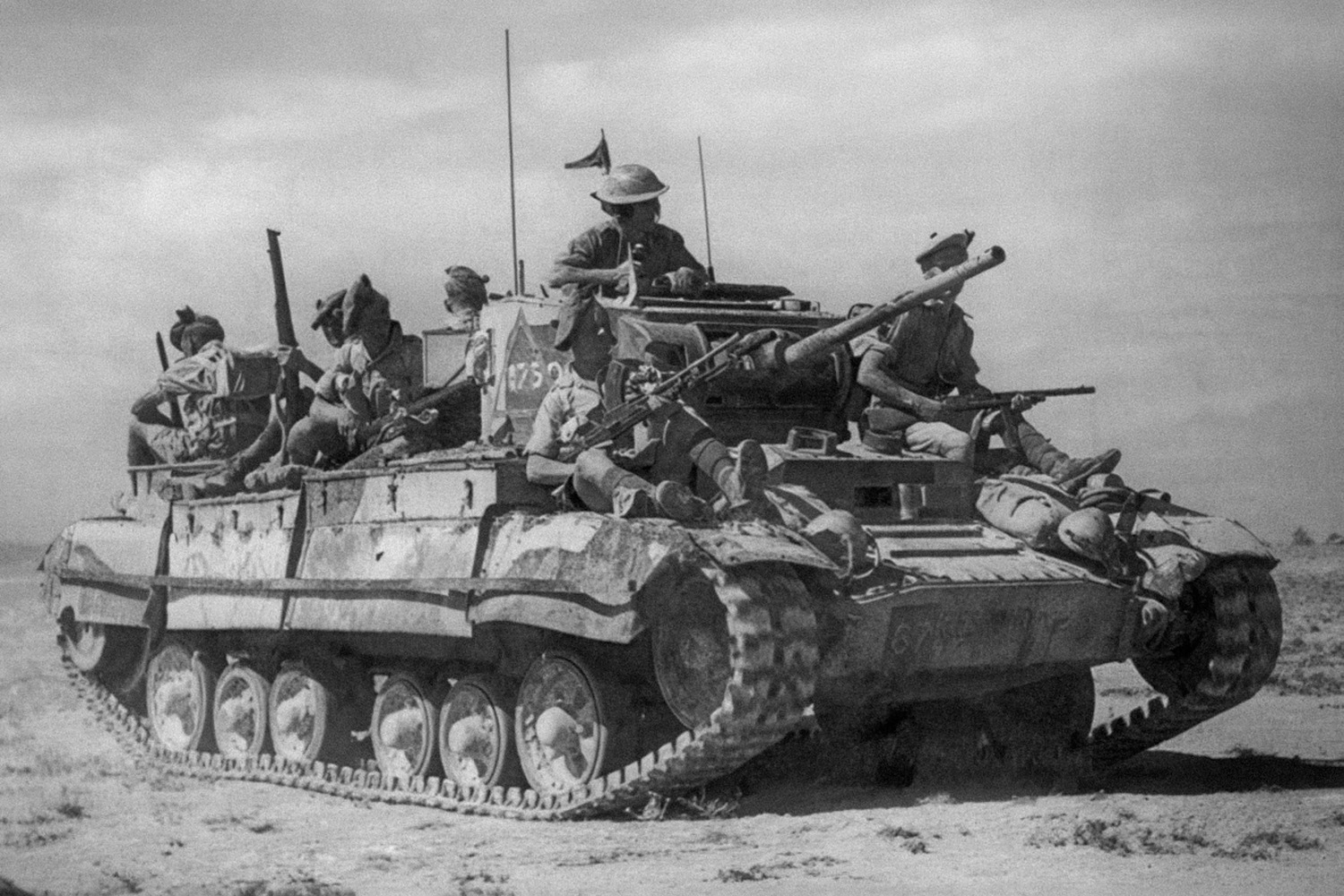
A Valentine tank in North Africa, carrying British infantry

This was the third attempt to break through in the northern sector, and the Axis defenders were expecting the attack. Like the previous attacks, it was hurriedly and therefore poorly planned. The Australian 24th Brigade managed to take their objectives on Miteirya Ridge by 02:00 (Note: Playfair states that the "...timing soon fell behind, but by 3 am the Australians had taken their objective") of 27 July. To the south, the British 69th Brigade set off at 01:30 and managed to take their objectives by about 08:00. However, the supporting anti-tank units became lost in the darkness or delayed by minefields, leaving the attackers isolated and exposed when daylight came. There followed a period during which reports from the battlefront regarding the minefield gaps were confused and conflicting. As a consequence, the advance of 2nd Armoured Brigade was delayed. Rommel launched an immediate counter-attack and the German armoured battlegroups overran the two forward battalions of 69th Brigade. Meanwhile, 50th RTR supporting the Australians was having difficulty locating the minefield gaps made by Australian 2/24th Battalion. They failed to find a route through and in the process were caught by heavy fire and lost 13 tanks. The unsupported 2/28th Australian battalion on the ridge was overrun. The 69th Brigade suffered 600 casualties and the Australians 400 for no gain.

The Eighth Army was exhausted, and on 31 July Auchinleck ordered an end to offensive operations and the strengthening of the defences to meet a major counter-offensive.

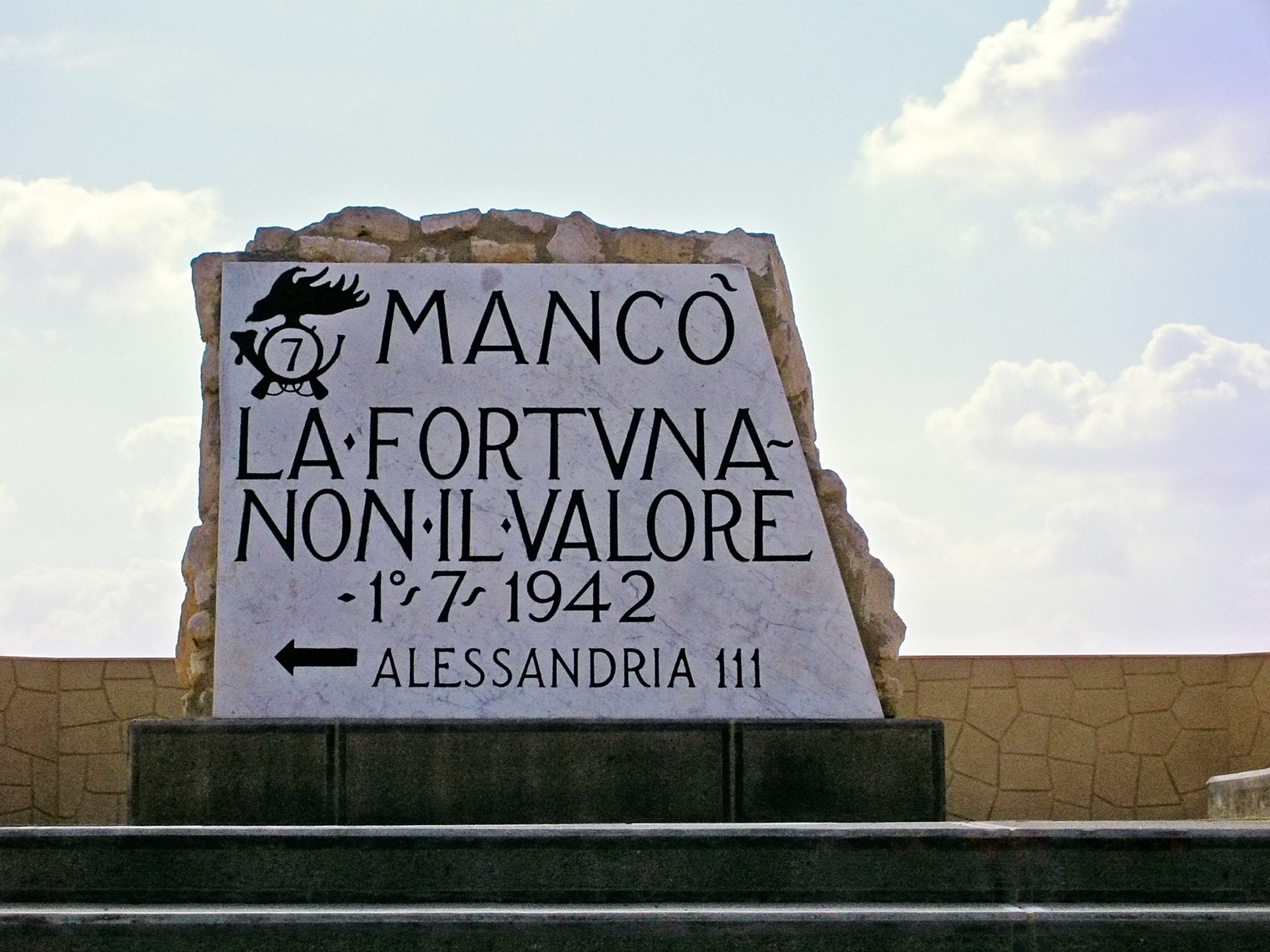
Commemorative stone put up by the 7th Bersaglieri Regiment on the road from Alexandria to El Alamein at the high-water mark for the Italian advance. The inscription reads: Mancò la fortuna, non-il valore (A lack of fortune, not of valour).

Rommel was later to blame the failure to break through to the Nile on how the sources of supply to his army had dried up and how:

then the power of resistance of many Italian formations collapsed. The duties of comradeship, for me particularly as their Commander-in-Chief, compel me to state unequivocally that the defeats which the Italian formations suffered at Alamein in early July were not the fault of the Italian soldier. The Italian was willing, unselfish and a good comrade, and, considering the conditions under which he served, had always given better than average. There is no doubt that the achievement of every Italian unit, especially of the motorised forces, far surpassed anything that the Italian Army had done for a hundred years. Many Italian generals and officers won our admiration both as men and as soldiers. The cause of the Italian defeat had its roots in the whole Italian military state and system, in their poor armament and in the general lack of interest in the war by many Italians, both officers and statesmen. This Italian failure frequently prevented the realisation of my plans.

— Rommel

Rommel complained bitterly about the failure of important Italian convoys to get desperately needed tanks and supplies through to him, always blaming the Italian Supreme Command, never suspecting British code breaking.

According to Dr James Sadkovich and others, Rommel often displayed a distinct tendency to blame and scapegoat his Italian allies to cover up his own mistakes and deficiencies as a commander in the field. For example, while Rommel was a very good tactical commander, the Italian and German High Commands were concerned that he lacked operational awareness and a sense of strategic objectives. Dr Sadkovich points out that he would often out-run his logistics and squander valuable (mostly Italian) military hardware and resources, in battle after battle, without clear strategic goals or an appreciation of the limited logistics with which his Italian allies were desperately trying to provide him.

== Aftermath ==
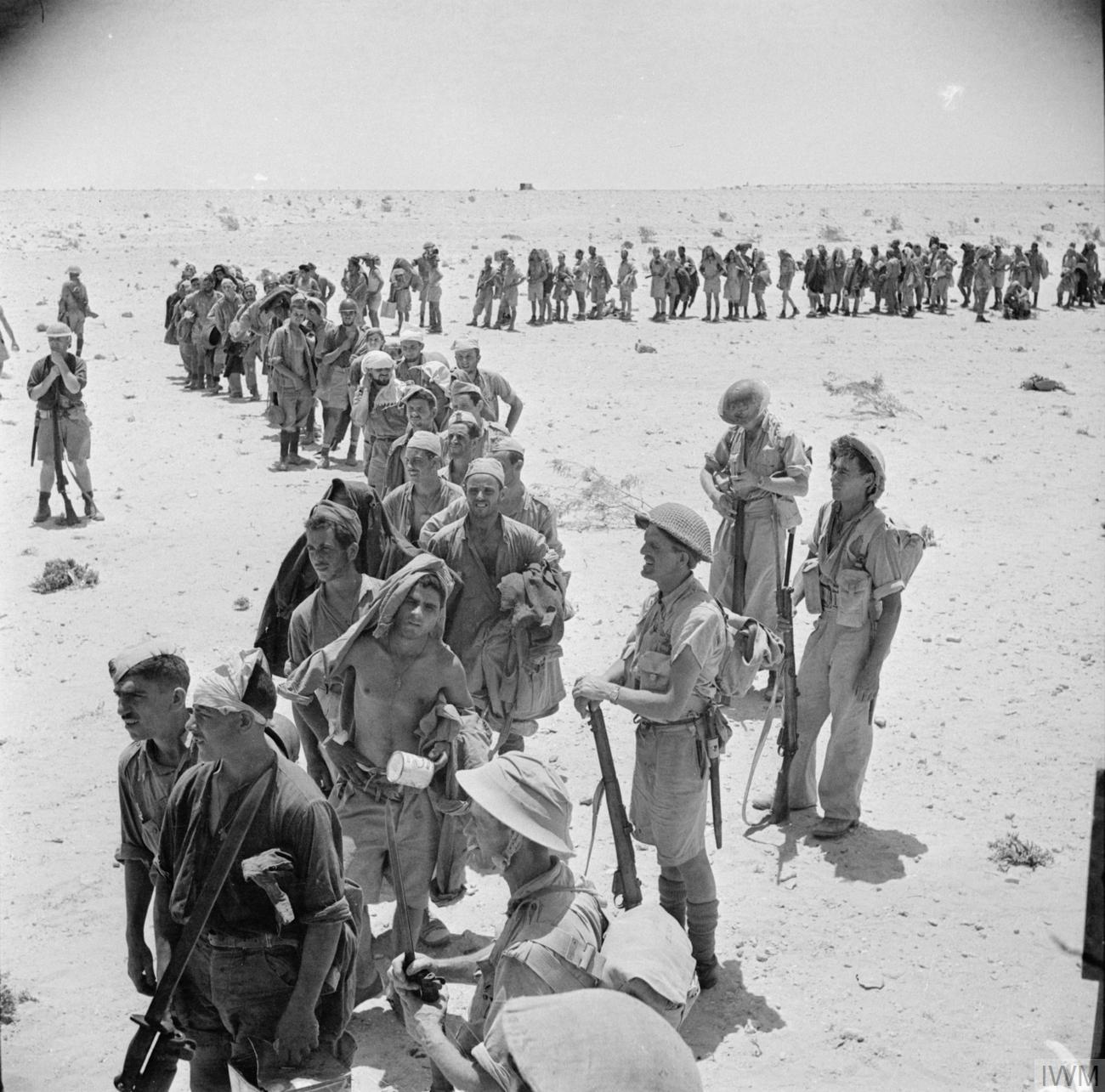
German and Italian prisoners captured during the advance on the Ruweisat Ridge, July 1942

The battle was considered a tactical stalemate, but a strategic victory, since it prevented the Axis from an advance on Alexandria (and then Cairo and ultimately the Suez Canal). The Eighth Army had suffered over 13,000 casualties in July, including 4,000 in the 2nd New Zealand Division, 3,000 in the 5th Indian Infantry Division and 2,552 battle casualties in the 9th Australian Division but had taken 7,000 prisoners and inflicted heavy damage on Axis men and machines. In his appreciation of 27 July, Auchinleck wrote that the Eighth Army would not be ready to attack again until mid-September at the earliest. He believed that because Rommel understood that with the passage of time the Allied situation would only improve, he was compelled to attack as soon as possible and before the end of August when he would have superiority in armour. Auchinleck therefore made plans for a defensive battle.

In early August, Winston Churchill and General Sir Alan Brooke—the Chief of the Imperial General Staff (CIGS)—visited Cairo on their way to meet Joseph Stalin in Moscow. They decided to replace Auchinleck, appointing the XIII Corps commander, William Gott, to the Eighth Army command and General Sir Harold Alexander as C-in-C Middle East Command. Persia and Iraq were to be split from Middle East Command as a separate Persia and Iraq Command and Auchinleck was offered the post of C-in-C (which he refused). Gott was killed on the way to take up his command when his aircraft was shot down. Lieutenant-General Bernard Montgomery was appointed in his place and took command on 13 August. (Note: Brooke and Auchinleck had both thought Montgomery a better candidate than Gott but Churchill had favoured his appointment.)

== Legacy ==
The battle and the Second Battle of El Alamein three months later remain important to some of the countries that took part. Particularly in New Zealand, this is due to the country's significant contribution to the defence of El Alamein, especially the heavy role the Māori Battalion played. Members of this battalion have been labelled war heroes since, such as commander Frederick Baker, James Henare and Eruera Te Whiti o Rongomai Love, the last of whom was killed in action.

== See also ==
- Alamein Memorial
- Battle of Alam el Halfa
- Italian War Memorial at El Alamein
- List of North African airfields during World War II
- Second Battle of El Alamein
- Timeline of the North African campaign
