= Murchison-Rushworth Rail Trail =

Rail trail in Victoria, Australia

The Murchison-Rushworth Rail Trail is a multi use bicycle and walking path being constructed along the former train line between Murchison and Rushworth in north central Victoria, Australia. As of November 2013, two kilometres of trail have been constructed at Rushworth, while another ten kilometres at the Murchison end are scheduled for completion by June 2014.

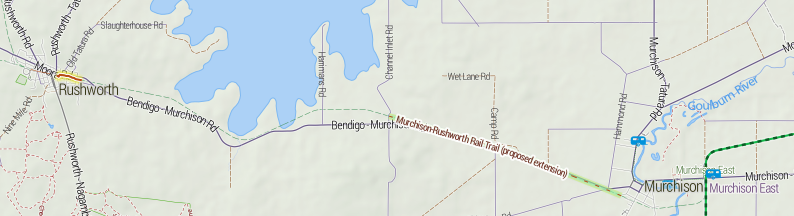
