= Italian War Memorial at El Alamein =

War memorial in El Alamein, Egypt

Coordinates: 30°50′29″N 28°56′34.1″E

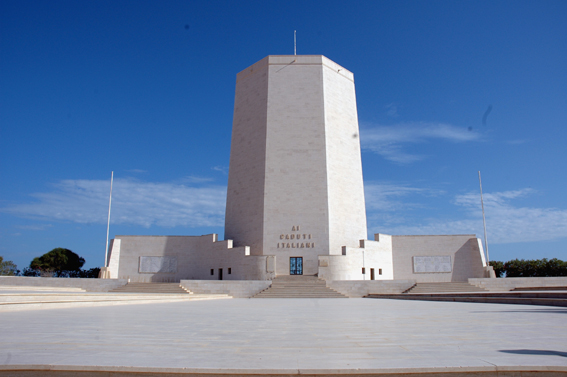
Memorial showing central tower

The Italian war memorial at El Alamein is an Italian war cemetery, museum, and memorial to the Italian soldiers who fought at the two Battles of El Alamein in World War II. It is located at the site of the battle, in Egypt.

== Background ==
At the Second Battle of El Alamein and the immediate retreat following, Italian losses were severe. The main mechanized arm of the Italian Army (132nd Armored Division "Ariete", 133rd Armored Division "Littorio", and 102nd Motorized Division "Trento", together composing XX Motorized Corps) was destroyed, as were the divisions of the other Italian corps engaged (X Corps, comprising 185th Infantry Division "Folgore", 27th Infantry Division "Brescia", and 17th Infantry Division "Pavia"). Most of the Italian units fought bravely and effectively, and their sacrifice allowed the rest of the Axis army in Africa to escape.

Italian forces had also been heavily engaged, and taken severe losses, at the First Battle of El Alamein. The Italian memorial memorializes both battles.

== Memorial ==
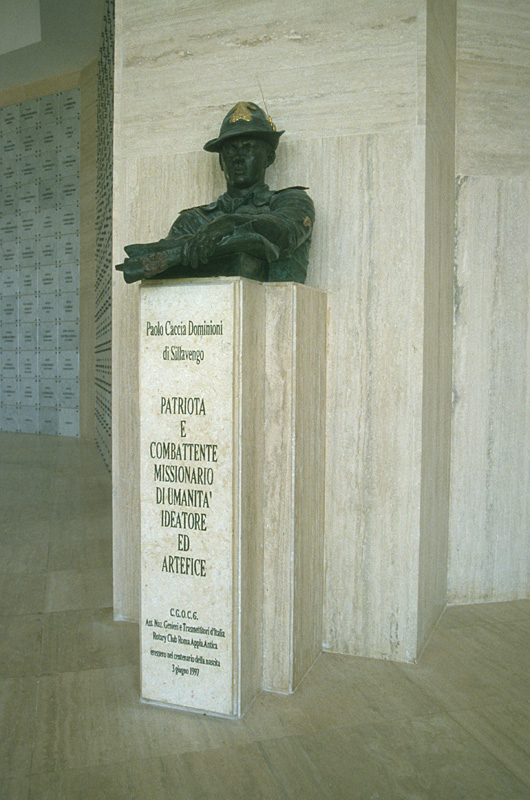
Bust of Paolo Caccia Dominioni, at the memorial

The Italian war memorial is built on Tel el-Eisa (Hill of Jesus) near the coast, a site of heavy fighting during the battle. (Tel el-Eisa is also referred to as "Hill 33" in descriptions of the battle.) It is the largest of the various national memorials at El Alamein. The main structure is a white marble tower.

Paolo Caccia Dominioni, who had been at the battle, was the driving force behind the construction of the memorial. Dominioni devoted his postwar life to collecting the remains of Italian dead from the battlefield and advocating for the construction of a memorial. He designed the memorial, which was constructed between 1954 and 1958 by the Italian government under Dominioni's direction (an Italian cemetery had existed at the site since 1943).

The cemetery contains several thousand graves, many marked "Ignoto" ("Unknown"). Some 38,000 Italian soldiers whose remains were never recovered are also honoured.

Due to Paolo Caccia Dominioni's twenty years of effort, the remains of thousands of German and British soldiers (as well as Italian) were also eventually identified and received a proper burial.

On 30 October 2012, a park was opened on the battle site to show visitors key points in the battle.

== See also ==
- Alamein Memorial, British
