= Italian National Ossario =

Ossuary for interned Italians in Australia during WWII

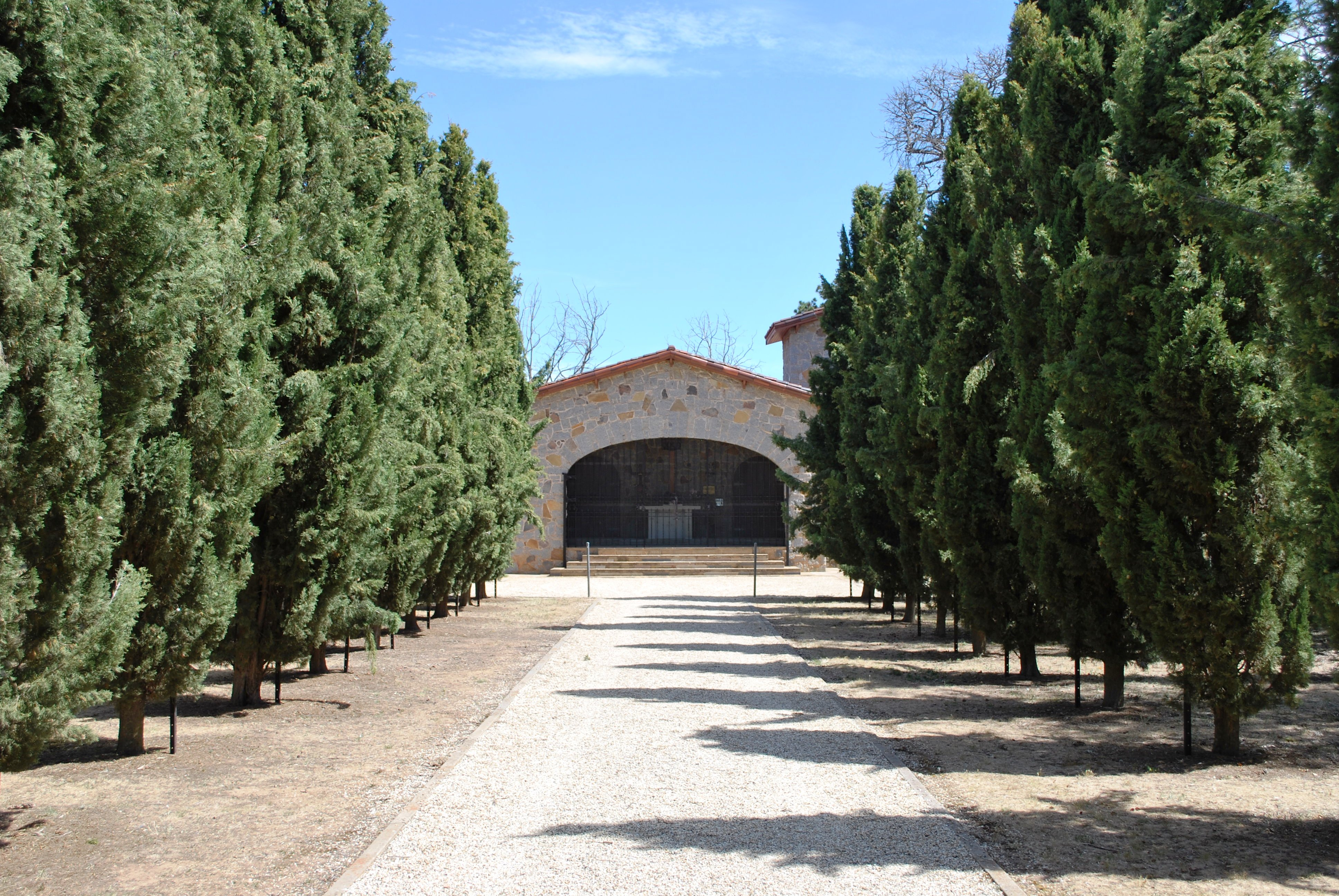
- The Italian National Ossario, 2009
- Interactive map of Italian National Ossario
- Location: Murchison, Victoria, Australia
- Coordinates: 36°37′39″S 145°13′24″E
- Designer: Paolo Caccia Dominioni
- Beginning date: 1958
- Completion date: 1961
- Dedicated date: 1961

The Italian National Ossario, also known as the Murchison Ossario, is an ossuary, war cemetery and war memorial in Murchison, a town in the Goulburn Valley region of Victoria, Australia. The ossario holds the remains of 130 Italians interned during World War II.

Construction work on the monument started in 1958 and the monument was consecrated in 1961. The ossuary was built from funds raised by local Italian communities in the Gouburn Valley with the fundraising effort led by Luigi Gigliotti. The ossario was designed by Paolo Caccia Dominioni who also designed the El Alamein Italian mausoleum in Egypt.

The 130 people interred in the ossuary include 129 men and one woman. Both prisoners of war sent to Australia as well as British and Australian residents of Italian descent interned as civilian enemy aliens are buried there.
