= Days Mill and Farm =

Day's Mill & Farm
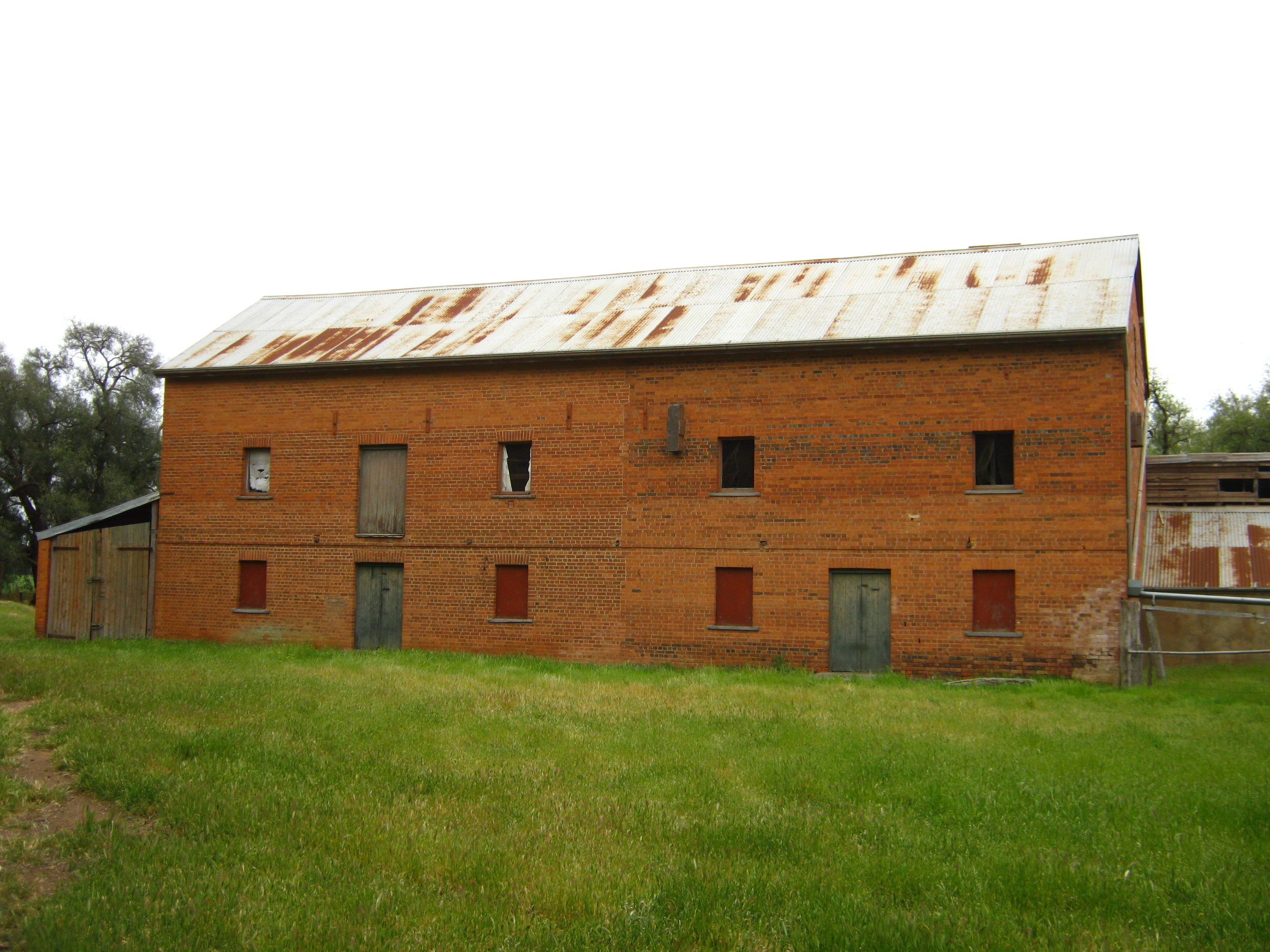
- Day's Mill & Farm
- Interactive map of the Day's Mill & Farm area

General information
- Location: Day Road, Murchison South, Victoria
- Coordinates: 36°40′37″S 145°12′19″E
- Construction started: 1865

Design and construction
- Designations: Victorian Heritage Register; Register of the National Estate (now defunct); National Trust Register (non-statutory)

Days Mill and Farm comprises an historic steam-driven flour mill, farm and homestead at Murchison South, Victoria, Australia constructed in 1865 by William and Anne Day. The mill is the best preserved 19th century flour mill in Victoria and a remarkably intact heritage site.

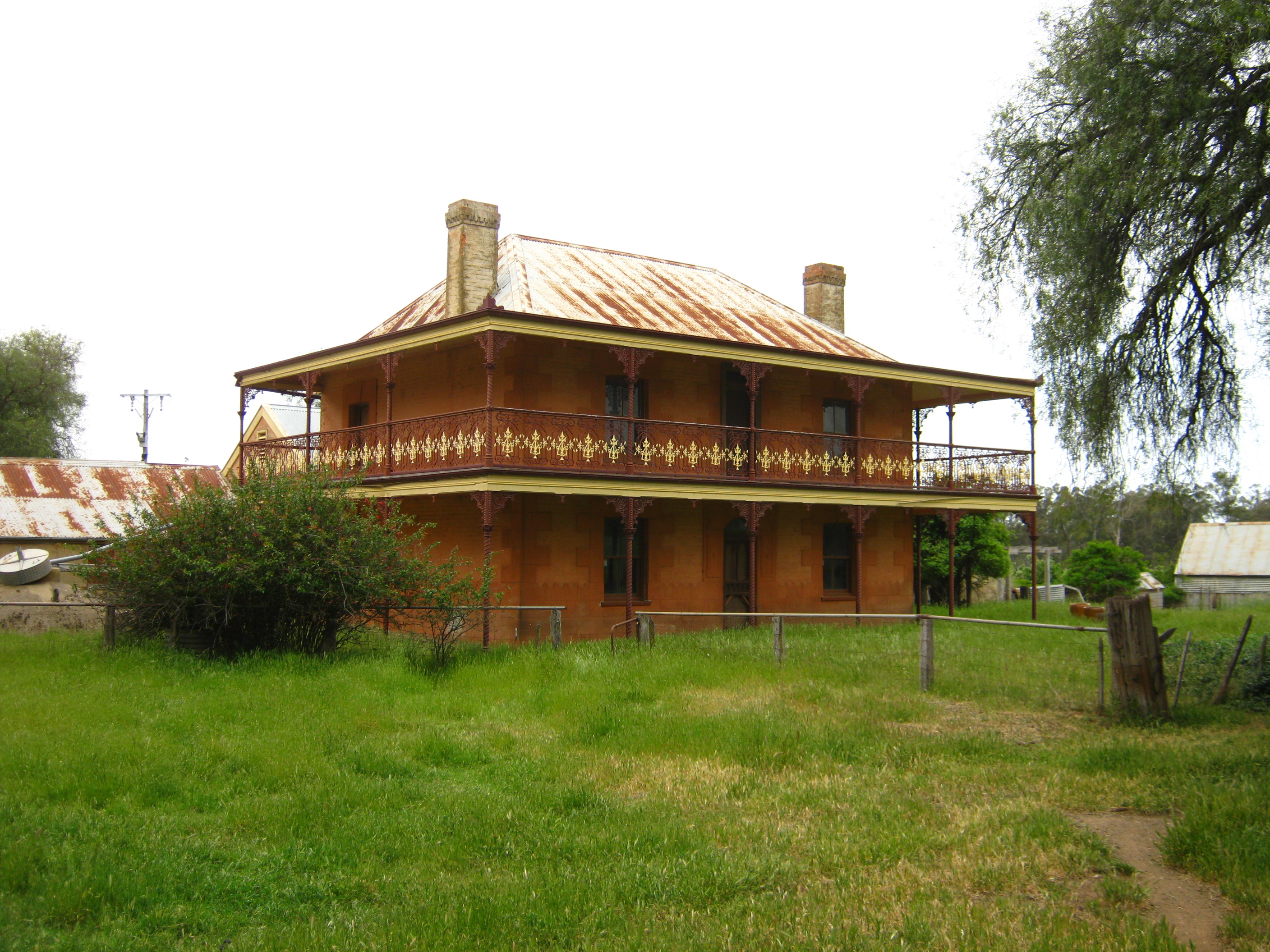
Days Mill Homestead, Murchison South

== Location ==
The mill and farm were part of an original 170-hectare (420-acre) property near the Goulburn River on Days Road, Murchison South, approximately 150 kilometres (93 mi) north of Melbourne. The historic property comprises 4 hectares (10 acres) with the surrounding farm land having been sold off privately.

== History ==
In 1865 William Day selected about 170 hectares (420 acres) in the Parish of Murchison. He was astute enough to notice that this recent Land Act had greatly increased farming activity in and built a two story flour mill. He also operated a bush sawmill and a punt over the Goulburn River and his wife Ann ran a local store.

William Day did not live to see the great migration of settlers into the Goulburn Valley. In August 1870, while trying to tame a young cow, William was thrown against a fence and suffered severe injuries to his legs and arms. He probably did not recover from this accident and died in 1872. Anne was left to support seven children, aged 5 to 19. She was not left without means, as William's estate was worth over £5,000. From 1872 until 1891 the farm and mill were run very capably by Anne Day, and during these years the farm was one of the more advanced properties in the district. A valuable collection of letters detailing the running of the farm during this period, reveal a picture of a strong woman astutely conducting business in the male dominated Victorian business world. Her letters detail her battles with impecunious selectors; her attempts to place flour in the Melbourne market; her battles with tardy agricultural machinery makers; and most importantly, her struggle to sell her farm produce at a good price in the Melbourne market.

Stone milling had proven unsuitable for the hard grains of Australia, as well as in the United States and the new European wheat frontier of Hungary, where millers and millwrights experimented with flour milling technology, and in the 1870s the new technology of iron roller mills was developed. Days Mill was not an economic proposition by the 1880s, when railway transport allowed competition from surrounding mills and Melbourne mills, and roller technology displaced the old stone mills. The Day family did not make the transition to the expensive new roller mills developed in the 1870s and they simply stopped milling flour in the late 1880s.

Anne Day retired from farming and storekeeping and the estate of her late husband was settled in 1891 and the eldest son, Joseph, took over the mill on Ann’s retirement and from then on the property operated simply as a farm, and the property was run only for farming, although Joseph occasionally ground chicken feed for his neighbours. in 1910 Joseph Day extended the size of his farm and acquired a further 320 acres. A third son, Henry, acquired 244 acres.

Today the site retains an almost intact nineteenth century assemblage of farming and flour milling equipment. Approached along a peppercorn and pine tree lined drive with a gatehouse at the entrance, the three-storey brick mill of 1865 and later granary extension is flanked by a two-storey brick residence with a two-storey encircling verandah that was added around 1905. The mill was driven by a rare early E T Bellhouse steam engine, which was powered by a Cornish boiler both of which intact. Other buildings on site include a large stable, chaff shed, blacksmith, butchery, dairy, shearing shed, milking shed, piggery and chook shed, constructed variously in hand made brick, timber and corrugated galvanised iron.

All the original mill machinery and equipment remains including three under driven mill stones, grain and meal elevators, a bolting reel, air leg aspirator, sack hoist and ancillary equipment.

== Preservation ==
The historic mill has been known to historians for many decades, and was first photographed as an historic site in about 1966. The Victorian government, through the Historic Buildings Council and National Estate Grants Program, purchased the property in 1985. It is included on the National Trust Register, the Victorian Heritage Register, and has been managed by Parks Victoria since 1996, and recently celebrated the 150th anniversary of the establishment of the mill and farm by the Day family.

== Other sources ==
- Burne, J. Architect. Historic Places Section. Department of Conservation and Natural Resources. Summary of Expenditure - NEGP - Days Mill, Murchison - Restoration Works. NEGP Report.
- Lardener, Helen & Kellaway, Dr Carlotta (May 1997). Department of Conservation & Natural Resources. Day's Mill & Farm, Murchison - conservation management plan.
- Day's Mill & Farm Murchison : handbook for summer school 10–18 February 1988 / compiled by Martin L. Hallett and Gary Vines. Museum of Victoria; Ministry for Conservation and Forests; Ministry for Planning and Environment, 1988.
- The Flour Mills of Victoria An Historical Record, W. Lewis Jones, Peggy Jones, Flour Millers' Council of Victoria, 1990
