= Girgarre railway line =

Former railway line in Victoria, Australia

Girgarre

Overview
- Status: Former train line Now Girgarre-Stanhope Rail Trail
- Owner: Victorian Railways (VR) (1917–1974); VR as VicRail (1974–1978); STA (V/Line) (1983–1987)
- Locale: Loddon Mallee (region), Victoria, Australia
- Termini: Rushworth; Girgarre
- Former connections: Colbinabbin
- Stations: 4 former stations

History
- Opened: 15 May 1917
- Completed: 15 May 1917
- Closed: 12 October 1987

Technical
- Line length: 23.000 km (14.292 mi)
- Num of tracks: Single track
- Track gauge: 1,600 mm (5 ft 3 in)

The Girgarre railway line is a closed 23-kilometre (14 mi) branch railway line situated in the Loddon Mallee region of Victoria, Australia. Constructed by the Victorian Railways, it branches from the Colbinabbin line at Rushworth station, and runs north from the town of Rushworth to Girgarre. The line was primarily built to serve the livestock and other farm industries as well as providing a general goods and passenger service to townships in the area.

== History ==
The line was opened in May 1917, and closed in 2 stages from March 1975 to October 1987.

=== Special trains ===
- As part of the 23rd tour, the Better Farming Train visited on 29 August 1928.
- 19 November 1924 - Joined with a train from Colbinabbin to form the Rushworth great picnic train (1300 passengers). It was the longest train, drawn by two engines, that officials had seen at Flinders Street Station.

== Stations ==
Station Histories
Station	Opened	Closed	Age
Rushworth	1 September 1890	12 October 1987	97 years
Karook	15 May 1917	21 October 1965	48 years
Stanhope	15 May 1917	12 October 1987	70 years
Girgarre	15 May 1917	1 March 1975	57 years

== Accidents ==
- 1929 - 28 January - The engine of the mixed train from Rushworth to Girgarre failed at Rushworth.
