= Colbinabbin railway line =

Former railway line in Victoria, Australia

Colbinabbin

Overview
- Other name: Rushworth
- Status: Former train line Now Murchison-Rushworth Rail Trail
- Owner: Victorian Railways (VR) (1890–1974); VR as VicRail (1974–1983); STA (V/Line) (1983–1987)
- Locale: Hume (region) & Loddon Mallee (region), Victoria, Australia
- Termini: Murchison East; Colbinabbin
- Connecting lines: Shepparton
- Former connections: Girgarre
- Stations: 8 former stations

History
- Opened: 1 September 1890
- Completed: 26 August 1914
- Closed: 12 October 1987

Technical
- Line length: 41.979 km (26.085 mi)
- Number of tracks: Single track
- Track gauge: 1,600 mm (5 ft 3 in)

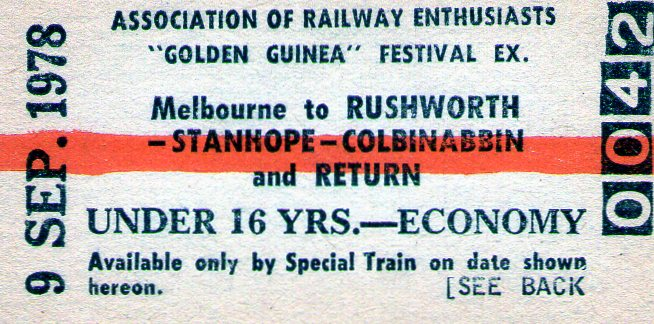
Melbourne to Rushworth, Colbinabbin & Girgarre souvenir rail ticket 1978

The Colbinabbin railway line, also known as the Rushworth railway line, is a closed 42-kilometre (26 mi) branch railway line situated in both the Hume and Loddon Mallee regions of Victoria, Australia. Constructed by the Victorian Railways, it branches from the Shepparton line at Murchison East station, and runs west from the town of Murchison East to Colbinabbin. The line was primarily built to serve the grain industries as well as providing a general goods and passenger service to townships in the area.

== History ==
The line was opened in 2 stages from September 1890 to August 1914, and closed in October 1987.

The line was eventually extended to Colbinabbin, opening in August 1914, and a branch from Rushworth to Girgarre opened in May 1917. The line to Girgarre was closed back to Stanhope in 1975, and the remaining sections were closed in October 1987.

== Stations ==
Station Histories
Station	Opened	Closed	Age	Notes
Murchison East	1 September 1890		135 years	Formerly Murchison
Murchison	1 September 1890	12 October 1987	97 years	
Hammond	1 September 1890	16 May 1955	64 years	Formerly Whroo Road Siding
Waranga	1 September 1890	16 May 1955	64 years	
Rushworth	1 September 1890	12 October 1987	97 years	
Erwen	26 August 1914	30 September 1977	63 years	
Wanalta	26 August 1914	30 September 1977	63 years	
Colbinabbin	26 August 1914	12 October 1987	73 years	
