= Murchison, Victoria =

Murchison
- Town
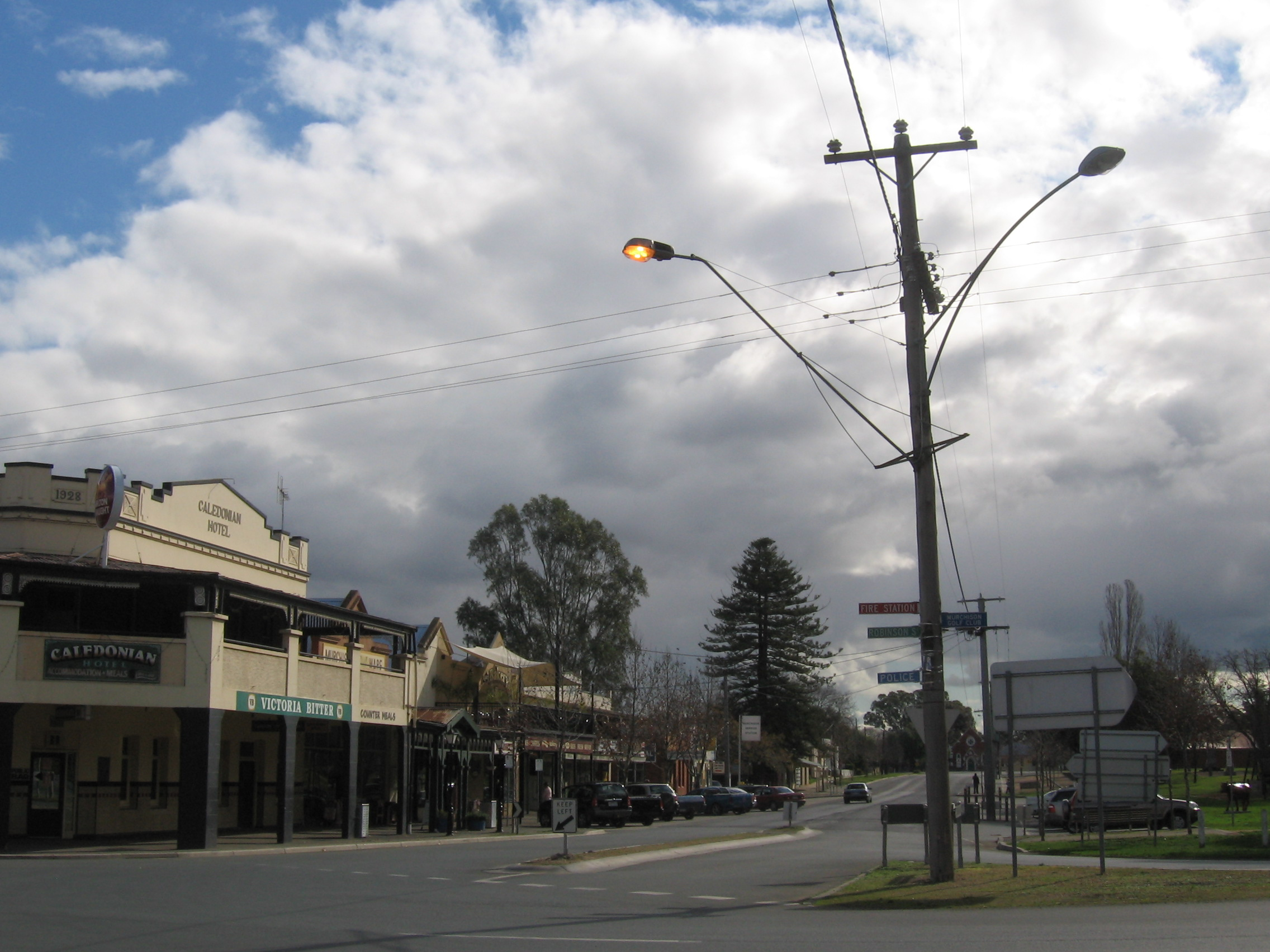
- Main street

- Interactive map of Murchison
- Coordinates: 36°37′S 145°13′E
- Country: Australia
- State: Victoria
- Region: Hume
- LGA: City of Greater Shepparton
- Location: 167 km (104 mi) from Melbourne; 40 km (25 mi) from Shepparton; 31 km (19 mi) from Nagambie

Government
  - State electorate: Euroa
  - Federal division: Nicholls
- Elevation: 125 m (410 ft)

Population
  - Total: 925 (2016 census)
- Postcode: 3610

Murchison is a town located on the Goulburn River in Victoria, Australia. Murchison is located 167 kilometres from Melbourne and is just to the west of the Goulburn Valley Highway between Shepparton and Nagambie. The surrounding countryside contains orchards, vineyards and dairy farms. At the 2016 census, Murchison had a population of 925.

== History ==
=== Pre-twentieth century ===
The Ngooraialum tribe were the Aboriginal inhabitants of the area. The first explorer to enter the Goulburn Valley was Thomas Mitchell who crossed the Goulburn River at Mitchellstown. The first Europeans to visit what would become the site were the drovers Joseph Hawdon and Charles Bonney who drove cattle between Mitchellstown and Adelaide.

Squatters started settling the area in 1840 with a school being established that year and a police station in 1841. The aboriginal protectorate was also transferred from Mitchellstown to Murchison in 1840 and closed in 1850.

French vigneron Ludovic Marie settled in Murchison in 1850 and established vineyards. He also set up a hotel and punt service over the Goulburn for gold miners travelling between Bendigo and Beechworth. A township was established in 1854 with the town being named after Captain John Murchison, an early settler.

The town grew rapidly, with a post office opening on 19 January 1855 (replacing an earlier office at Warranga), a flour mill in 1858 and a Presbyterian church and school in 1859. Small selectors started settling the area after 1870. A bridge was built over the Goulburn to replace the punt service in 1871, with a newspaper, courthouse and mechanics' institute being established in 1870.

The town grew further in 1875 with the arrival of the first paddle steamer. At that time, Murchison had six hotels, a number of general stores, two flour mills including the highly intact Days Mill and Farm at Murchison South, and numerous stores and services. In 1878, Murchison became the base for operations against Ned Kelly and his gang. The railway reached Murchison East in 1880 and a second station named Murchison was opened on the line to Rushworth in 1890.

The building of the Goulburn Weir for irrigation in 1887-90 meant that the Goulburn River was no longer navigable by paddle steamer, which led to Murchison declining in importance. The development of irrigation led to the growth of nearby towns, notably Shepparton. The Waranga Basin was developed in the early part of the twentieth century approximately 15 kilometres from the town.

=== Twentieth century ===
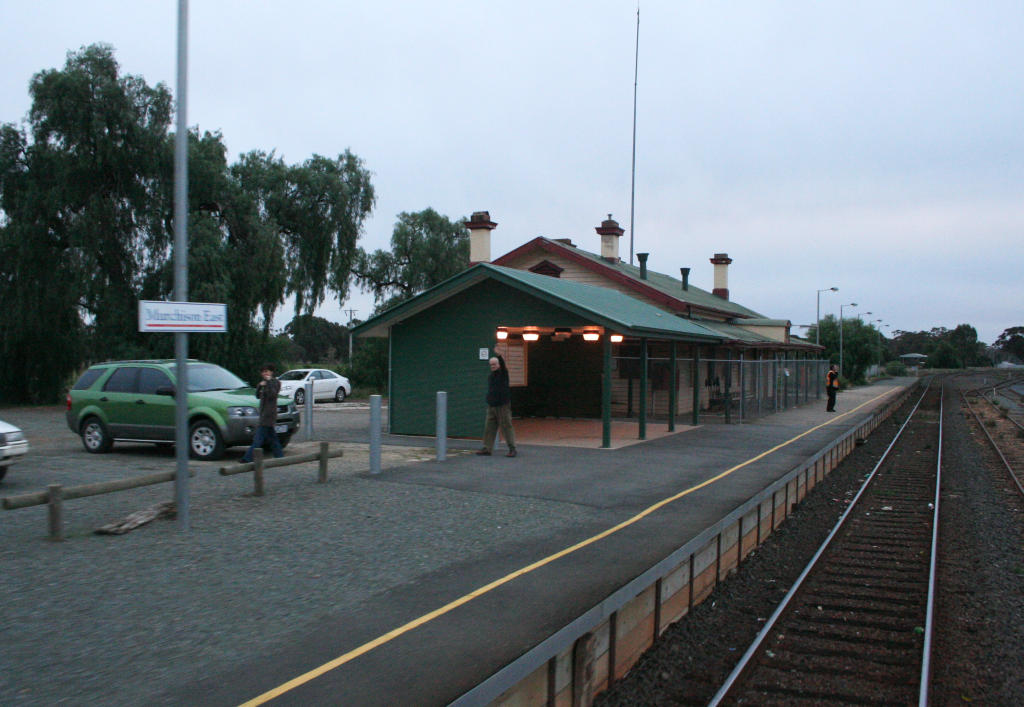
Muchison East station

Approximately 4,000 Italian, Japanese and German prisoners of war (POWs) were interned near the town between 1941 and 1947. Dhurringile Homestead, 11 kilometres to the north, was used as a POW camp for German officers while the Italians and Japanese were kept at an internment camp in the town. The prisoner of war camp employed 675 people with the Italians and Japanese prisoners working as fruitpickers. The German POWs were not used. After the camps closed in 1947, the internment camp became an Italian war memorial while Dhurringhile Homestead became a minimum security prison, HM Prison Dhurringile.

The Italian National Ossario is located at Murchison cemetery and holds the remains of 130 Italian soldiers and civilians who died while interned in Australia.

==== Murchison meteorite ====
On 28 September 1969 a meteorite shower fell 2 kilometres south of Murchison. Many local residents collected samples of these meteorites reducing the chance of contamination. The rocks were analysed at the NASA Ames Research Center where they were discovered to contain the first convincing evidence of amino acids of extraterrestrial origin, supporting the Miller–Urey experiment. The Murchison meteorite samples contained 90 different amino acids, only 19 of which are found on earth. The meteorite has been found to contain the oldest materials known to have reached earth. The Meteorite Park in the centre of Murchison celebrates this discovery.

== Transport ==
Murchison East station is serviced by V/Line passenger trains on the Shepparton Line.

== Notable people ==
Marion (Bill) Edwards, a transsexual barman, was born here on 19 March 1874.

== Sport ==
The town has an Australian Rules football team competing in the Kyabram & District Football League. The seniors won the 2013 league premiership. On September 14 2024 at Mooroopna, the Grasshoppers' seniors and reserves teams won the KDFL premiership, defeating Shepparton East and Stanhope respectively.

Golfers play at the course of the Murchison Golf Club on Goulburn Valley Highway, Murchison East.

World Headbutting Champion Gianni Vazzoler resides in Murchison since winning his title in nearby Shepparton in 2013 against Captain Redbeard.

== Further reference ==
- Murchison Victoria Tourism Website
