= Alamein Memorial =

War memorial in El Alamein, Egypt

- Commonwealth War Graves Commission
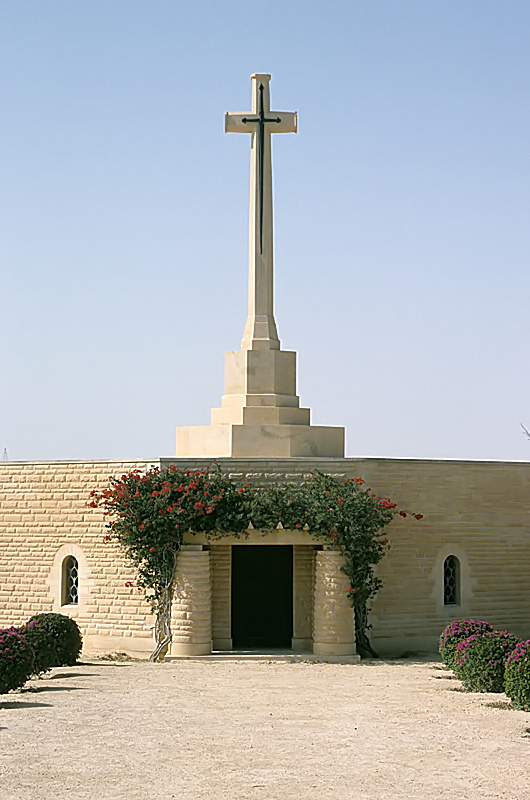
- For land force soldiers of the Commonwealth who died in the campaigns in Egypt, Libya and in the operations of the Eighth Army in Tunisia up to 19 February 1943, and airmen of the Commonwealth who died in the campaigns in Egypt, Libya, Syria, Lebanon, Iraq, Greece, Crete and the Aegean, Ethiopia, Eritrea and the Somalilands, the Sudan, East Africa, Aden and Madagascar, and in service of the Rhodesian and South African Air Training Scheme and have no known grave.
- Unveiled: 24 October 1954
- Location: near El Alamein, Egypt
- Designed by: Hubert Worthington
- Commemorated: 11,866

The Alamein Memorial is a Commonwealth War Graves Commission war memorial in the El Alamein War Cemetery, El Alamein, Egypt. The memorial commemorates 11,866 Commonwealth forces members who died during World War II. The memorial was designed by Hubert Worthington and unveiled by Viscount Montgomery of Alamein on 24 October 1954.

The memorial commemorates a collection of different areas of service and geography. For land forces the memorial largely commemorates those who died during the Western Desert campaign as well as in Syria, Lebanon, Iraq and Iran and have no known grave. For airmen the memorial commemorates those that died in Egypt, Libya, Syria, Lebanon, Iraq, Greece, Crete and the Aegean, Ethiopia, Eritrea, the Somalilands, the Sudan, East Africa, Aden and Madagascar and in service of the Rhodesian and South African Air Training Scheme and have no known grave. The memorial is collocated with El Alamein War Cemetery, which largely contains the graves of men who died at all stages of the Western Desert Campaign.

The inscription at the entrance to the cloister reads:

Within this cloister are inscribed the names of the soldiers and airmen of the British Commonwealth and Empire who died fighting on land or in the air where two continents meet and to whom the fortune of war denied a known and honoured grave. With their fellows who rest in this cemetery with their comrades-in-arms of the Royal Navy and with the seamen of the Merchant Navy they preserved for the West the link with the East and turned the tide of war.

== Design ==
When designing the memorial, Worthington followed similar principles to First World War memorials, but made modifications on account of the climate and environment in Africa. This included building tall walls to keep out drifting sand, providing shelters from the sun, and planting succulents, including cacti in place of plants more common in Europe.

== War cemetery ==
The attached war cemetery has graves of soldiers from various countries who fought on the Allied side. Buried here are 6,425 identified Commonwealth service personnel, 815 unidentified ones, and 102 of other nationalities. These include four Victoria Cross recipients:

- Private Percy Gratwick, Second Australian Imperial Force
- Private Arthur Stan Gurney, Second Australian Imperial Force
- Sergeant William Bill Kibby, Second Australian Imperial Force
- Private Adam Wakenshaw, Durham Light Infantry

Others buried here include:

- Squadron Leader George Barclay, Royal Air Force Battle of Britain fighter pilot
- Major Henry Rew, Royal Tank Regiment

This has monuments commemorating Greek, New Zealand, Australian, South African, Indian and Canadian forces. The cemetery entrance is through the Alamein Memorial and there is also a separate Alamein Cremation Memorial to 603 Commonwealth service personnel who died in Egypt and Libya and were cremated in line with their religion.

The names of 213 Canadian airmen appear on the Alamein Memorial in Egypt.

The cemetery was designed by Hubert Worthington.

== See also ==
- Italian War Memorial at El Alamein
