= Black Saturday bushfires =

2009 Australian fires

Black Saturday Bushfires
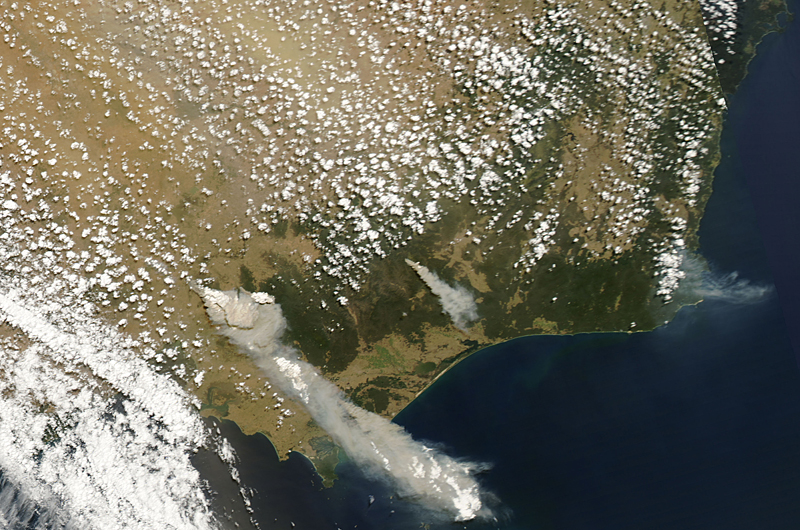
- MODIS Aqua satellite image of smoke plumes and a pyrocumulus cloud northeast of Melbourne during the morning of 7 February 2009.
- Date: 7 February – 14 March 2009
- Location: Victoria, Australia

Statistics
- Burned area: 450,000 hectares (1,100,000 acres)
- Land use: Urban/Rural Fringe Areas, Farmland, and Forest Reserves/National Parks

Impacts
- Deaths: 173
- Injuries: 414
- Structures destroyed: 3,500+ (2,029 houses)

Ignition
- Cause: Various confirmed sources including: Power lines; Arson; Lightning; Machinery

The Black Saturday bushfires were a series of bushfires that either ignited or were already burning across the Australian state of Victoria on Saturday, 7 February 2009, and was one of Australia's all-time worst bushfire disasters. The fires occurred during extreme bushfire weather conditions and resulted in Australia's highest-ever loss of human life from a bushfire, with 173 fatalities. Many people were left homeless and without families as a result.

As many as 400 individual fires were recorded on Saturday 7 February; the day has become widely referred to in Australia as Black Saturday.

Then Deputy Prime Minister Julia Gillard described Black Saturday as "a tragedy beyond belief, beyond precedent and beyond words … one of the darkest days in Australia’s peacetime history."

The 2009 Victorian Bushfires Royal Commission, headed by Justice Bernard Teague, was held in response to the bushfires.

== Background ==
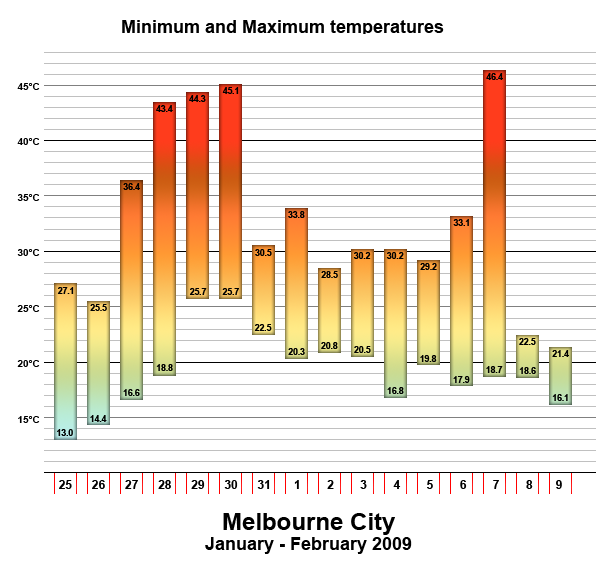
Temperature graph for Melbourne during the peak of the heatwave

A week before the fires, a significant heatwave affected southeastern Australia. From 28 to 30 January, Melbourne broke temperature records by experiencing three consecutive days above 43 °C (109 °F), with the temperature peaking at 45.1 °C (113.2 °F) on 30 January, the third hottest day in the city's history.

The wave of heat was caused by a slow-moving high-pressure system that settled over the Tasman Sea, with a combination of an intense tropical low located off the North West Australian coast and a monsoon trough over northern Australia, which produced ideal conditions for hot tropical air to be directed down over southeastern Australia.

The February fires commenced on a day when several localities across the state, including Melbourne, recorded their highest temperatures since records began in 1859. On 6 February 2009—the day before the fires started—the Country Fire Authority chief Russell Rees warned "We are in almost uncharted territory" in terms of bushfire conditions. The Premier of Victoria John Brumby issued a warning about the extreme weather conditions expected on 7 February: "It's just as bad a day as you can imagine and on top of that the state is just tinder-dry. People need to exercise real common sense tomorrow". The Premier went on to state that it was expected to be the "worst day [of fire conditions] in the history of the state".

== Events of 7 February 2009 ==
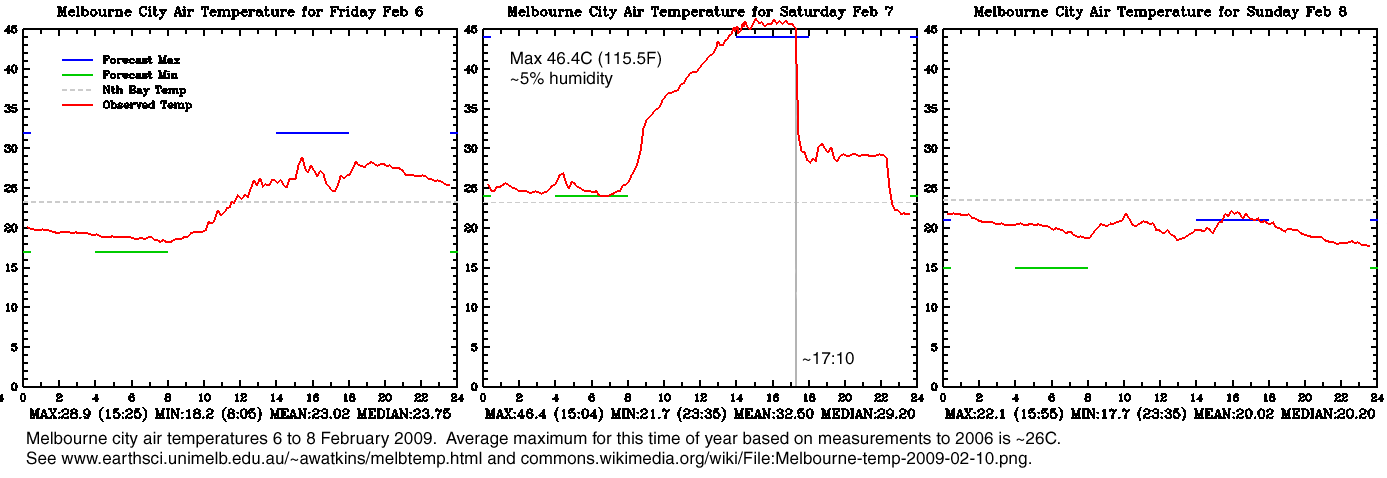
Melbourne air temperature on 6, 7 and 8 February 2009

More than 19,000 firefighting personnel, mainly from the Country Fire Authority (CFA) and Department of Sustainability and Environment (DSE), were deployed across the state on Friday evening (6 February) in anticipation of the extreme conditions the following day. By mid-morning Saturday, hot northwesterly winds in excess of 100 kilometres per hour (62 mph) hit the state, accompanied by extremely high temperatures and extremely low humidity; a total fire ban was declared for the entire state of Victoria.

As the day progressed, the highest-ever temperatures recorded to date were reached. Melbourne hit 46.4 °C (115.5 °F), the hottest temperature ever recorded for the city and humidity levels dropped to as low as two percent. The McArthur Forest Fire Danger Index reached unprecedented levels, ranging from 160 to over 200. This was higher than the fire weather conditions experienced on Black Friday in 1939 and Ash Wednesday in 1983.

Around midday, as wind speeds were reaching their peak, an incorrectly rigged 'SWER' (single-wire earth return) mains power cable was ripped down at Kilmore East. This sparked a bushfire that became the deadliest and most intense firestorm ever recorded in Australia. The overwhelming majority of fire activity occurred between the afternoon of 7 February and 7:00 pm, a period when wind speed and temperature were at their highest, and humidity at its lowest.

== Chronology ==
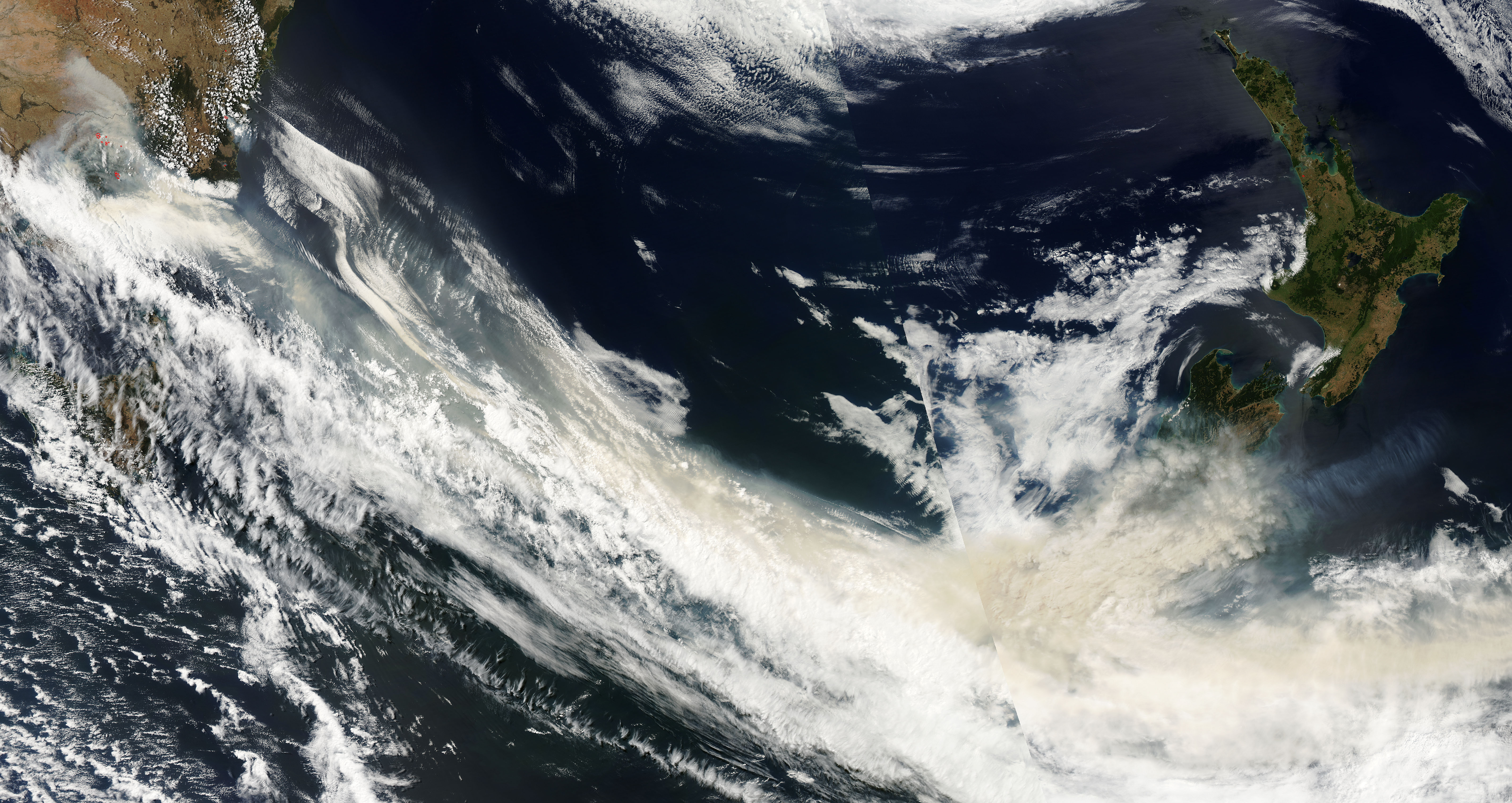
MODIS imagery shows smoke from the fires carried by winds over the Tasman Sea to New Zealand's South Island on 8 February

Wednesday, 28 January 2009

- Delburn fire commenced in South Gippsland; arson suspected.

Wednesday, 4 February 2009

- Bunyip State Park blaze commenced.

Saturday, 7 February 2009 (Black Saturday)

- 05:00 am – Bunyip State Park fire jumped containment lines; no other major fire activity.
- Late morning – Many fires sprang up as temperatures rose and wind speeds increased.
- 11:50 am – Power lines fell in high winds igniting the Kilmore East fire (Kinglake/Whittlesea area). The fire was fanned by 125 km/h (78 mph) winds, entered a pine plantation, grew in intensity, and rapidly headed southeast through the Wandong area.
- 12:30 pm – Horsham fire commenced.
- 12:30 pm – ABC Local Radio abandoned regular programming to cover the fire situation.
- 12:45 pm – Hume Freeway was closed after fire crews were unable to contain Kilmore East fire.
- Early afternoon – ABC Local Radio received calls from residents of affected areas supplying immediate up-to-date information on fire activity.
- 2:55 pm – Murrindindi Mill fire (Marysville area) first spotted from Mt Despair fire tower.
- 3:04 pm – temperature in Melbourne peaked at 46.4 °C (115.5 °F).
- 4:20 pm – Kilmore East fire front arrived at Strathewen.
- 4:20 pm – Murrindindi Mill fire impacted Narbethong.
- Mid-afternoon – smoke from Kilmore East firestorm prevented planes from mapping the fire edge.
- 4:30 pm – number of individual fires across the state increased into the hundreds.
- 4:30 pm – fire commenced at Eaglehawk, near Bendigo.
- 4:45 pm – Kilmore East fire front arrived at Kinglake.
- 5:00 pm – wind direction changed from northwesterly to southwesterly in Melbourne (see Fawkner Beacon Wind chart for 7 February 2009).
- 5:10 pm – air temperature in Melbourne dropped from over 45 °C (113 °F) to around 30 °C (86 °F) in fifteen minutes.
- 5:30 pm – wind change arrived at Kilmore East and Murrindindi Mill (Kinglake/Marysville) fire fronts.
- 5:45 pm – Kilmore East fire front arrived in Flowerdale.
- 6:00 pm – Beechworth fire commenced.
- 6:00 pm – Kilmore East fire smoke plume and pyrocumulus cloud reached 15 km (9.3 mi) high.
- 6:45 pm – Murrindindi Mill fire front arrived at Marysville.
- 8:30 pm – Victorian Health Emergency Co-ordination Centre notified Melbourne hospitals to prepare for burn victims.
- 8:57 pm – CFA chief officer first notified that casualties had been confirmed.
- 10:00 pm – Victoria Police announced an initial estimate of 14 fatalities.

Sunday, 8 February 2009

- Kilmore East and Murrindindi Mill fires merged to form the Kinglake fire complex.
- Wilsons Promontory fire ignited by lightning.
- Victoria Police increased estimate to 25 fatalities.

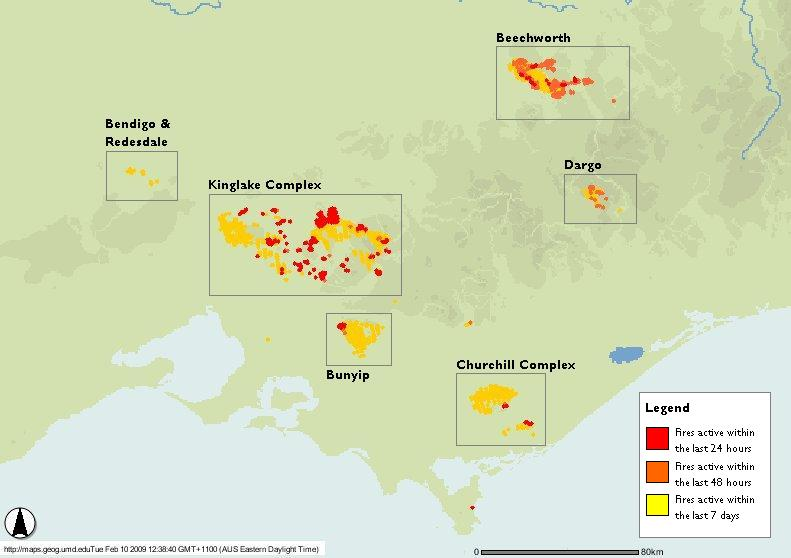
Map of fire locations on 10 February

Tuesday, 10 February 2009

- Spot fires from Kinglake complex fires merged to form the Maroondah/Yarra complex.

Tuesday, 17 February 2009

- Six fires still burned out of control, with another nineteen contained.
- Containment lines surrounded 85 per cent of the Kinglake–Murrindindi complex.
- The Kilmore East – Murrindindi complex south fire burned in Melbourne's O'Shannassy and Armstrong Creek water catchments.
- Bunyip and Beechworth fires almost contained.

Thursday, 19 February 2009

- Victoria Police increased estimate to 208 fatalities.

Monday, 23 February 2009

- Temperatures in the mid-30 degrees Celsius (mid-90 degrees Fahrenheit), northerly winds, and a cool change precipitated a flare-up of many of the fires, and ignited several new fires.
- The most significant new fires were in the southern Dandenong Ranges near Upwey, south of Daylesford (near Hogans Lane, Musk, Victoria), and in the Otway Ranges.
- Weather conditions directed previously burning fires in the Yarra Ranges towards settlements in the upper Yarra Valley, but the fires were of a low intensity and were quickly contained.

Friday, 27 February 2009

- Bunyip fire still burnt within control lines in the Bunyip State Park and State Forest areas.
- The Kilmore East – Murrindindi complex north fire burned within containment lines on the southeastern flank.
- The Kilmore East – Murrindindi complex south fire activity continued in areas close to several towns in the Yarra Valley near both Yarra Glen and Warburton.
- The Wilsons Promontory Cathedral fire had burnt 24,150 ha (59,700 acres) and was still burning.
- The French Island fire slowly burnt in uninhabited grass and scrub bushland on the northeast end of the island.

Tuesday, 3 March 2009

- Extreme bushfire conditions predicted for Monday night and early Tuesday morning, involving very strong northerlies, with a change forecast to arrive by Tuesday morning. Mobile phone companies trialled technology by sending Victorians and Tasmanians three million SMS messages on behalf of Victoria Police.

Wednesday, 4 March 2009

- Cooler conditions and rain from 4–6 March enabled firefighters to control and contain several fires, with the Kilmore East – Murrindindi complex south fire being completely contained.
- Predictions for favourable weather signalled the easing of the threat to settlements from the major fires that had been burning since 7 February.

Mid-March 2009

- Favourable conditions aided containment efforts and extinguished many of the fires.

== Major fires ==
=== Kinglake–Marysville fires ===
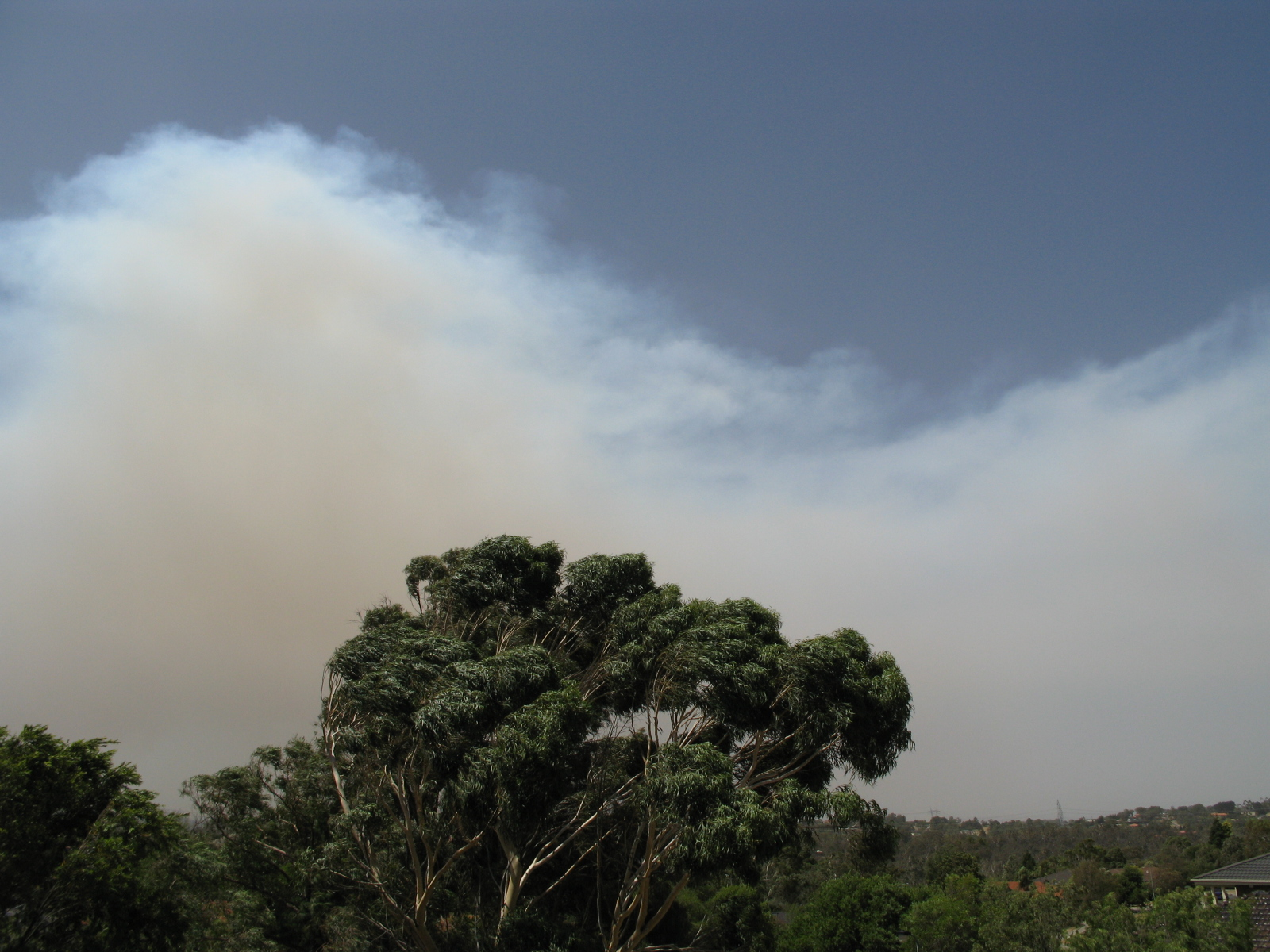
The large smoke cloud from the Kilmore East fire, being blown across Melbourne's northeast at 2:49 pm

The Kinglake fire complex was named after two earlier fires, the Kilmore East fire and the Murrindindi Mill fire, merged following the wind change on the evening of 7 February. The complex was the largest of the many fires burning on Black Saturday, ultimately destroying over 330,000 ha (820,000 acres). It was also the most destructive, with over 1,800 houses destroyed and 159 lives lost in the region.

==== Kinglake area (Kilmore East fire) ====
Just before midday on 7 February, high winds felled a 2 km (1.2 mi) section of power lines owned by SP AusNet in Kilmore East, sparking a fire at approximately 11:45 am in open grasslands that adjoined pine plantations. The fire was fanned by extreme northwesterly winds, and travelled 50 km (31 mi) southeast in a narrow fire front through Wandong and Clonbinane, into Kinglake National Park, and then onto the towns of Humevale, Kinglake West, Strathewen and St Andrews.

The cool change passed through the area around 5:30 pm, bringing strong southwesterly winds. The wind change turned the initial long and narrow fire band into a wide firefront that moved in a northeast direction through Kinglake, Steels Creek, Dixons Creek, Chum Creek, Toolangi, Hazeldene, Broadford and Flowerdale.

The area became the worst-impacted in the state, with a total of 120 deaths and more than 1,200 homes destroyed.

The cause of the Kilmore East-Kinglake bushfire was found by the 2009 Victorian Bushfires Royal Commission to be an ageing SP AusNet power line.

==== Marysville area (Murrindindi Mill fire) ====
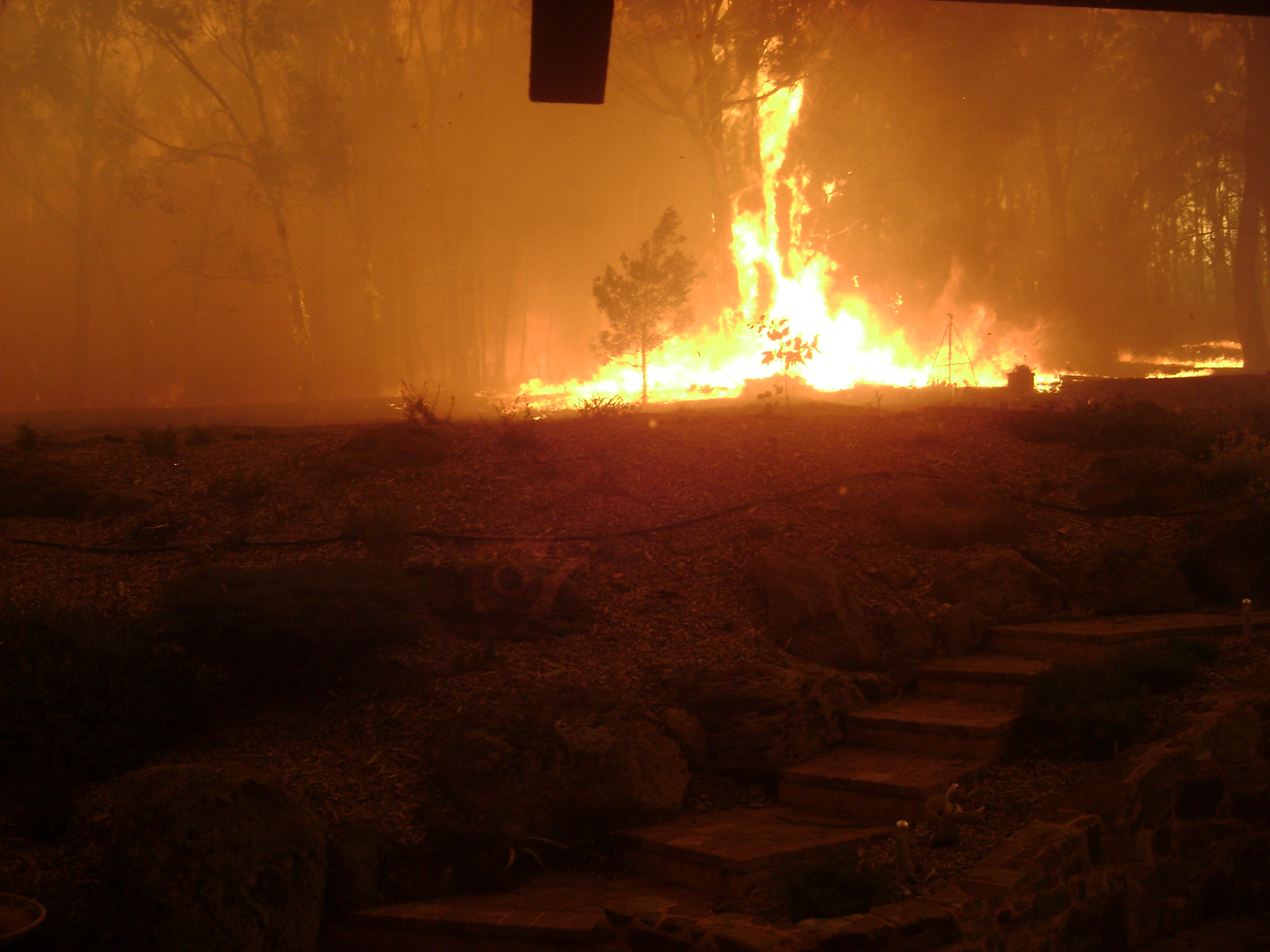
Fire approaching a residence in Steels Creek at 6:11 pm

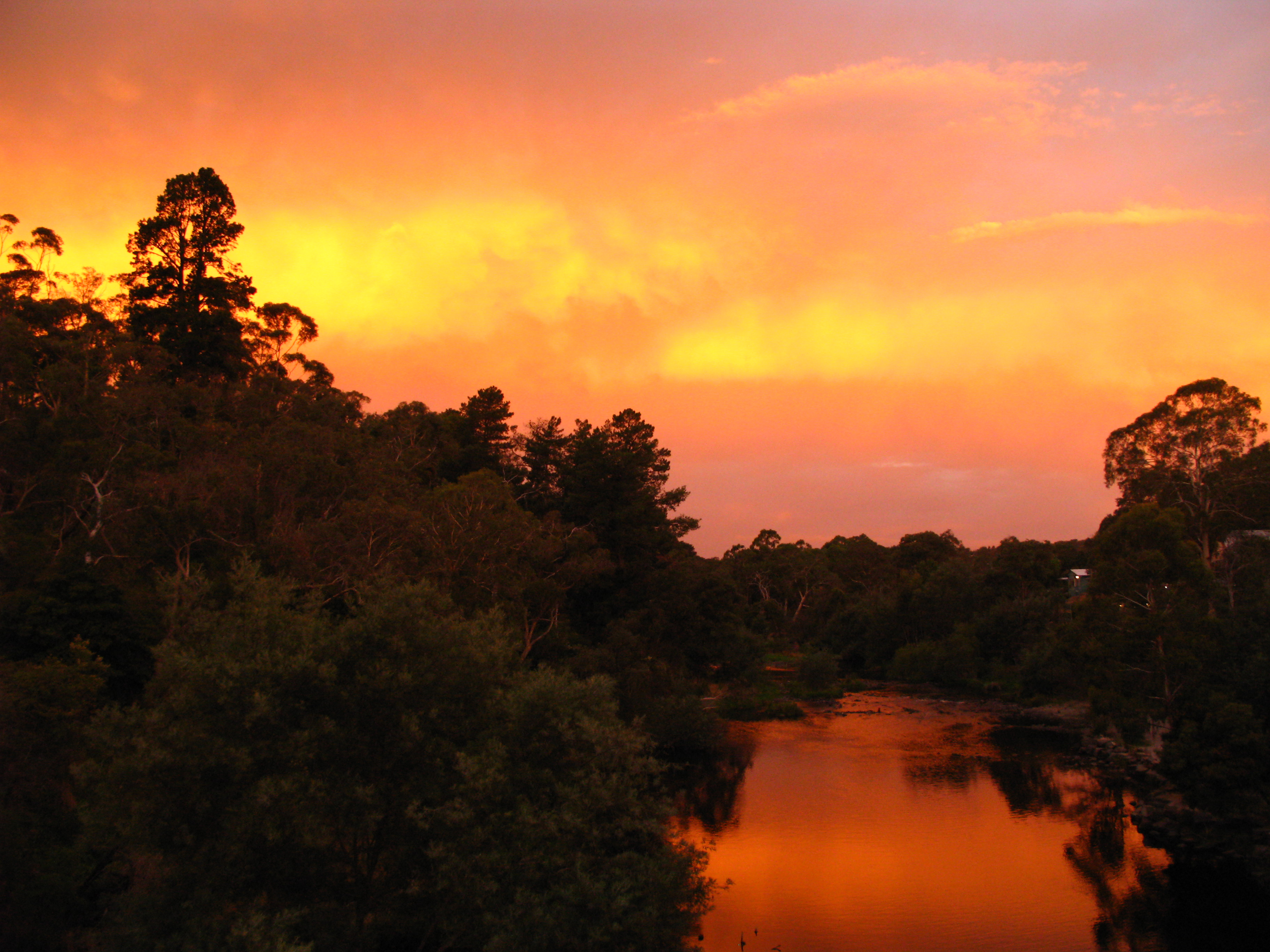
Smoke mixed with cloud over Warrandyte, looking northeast across the Yarra River, towards the Kinglake fire complex on 8 February

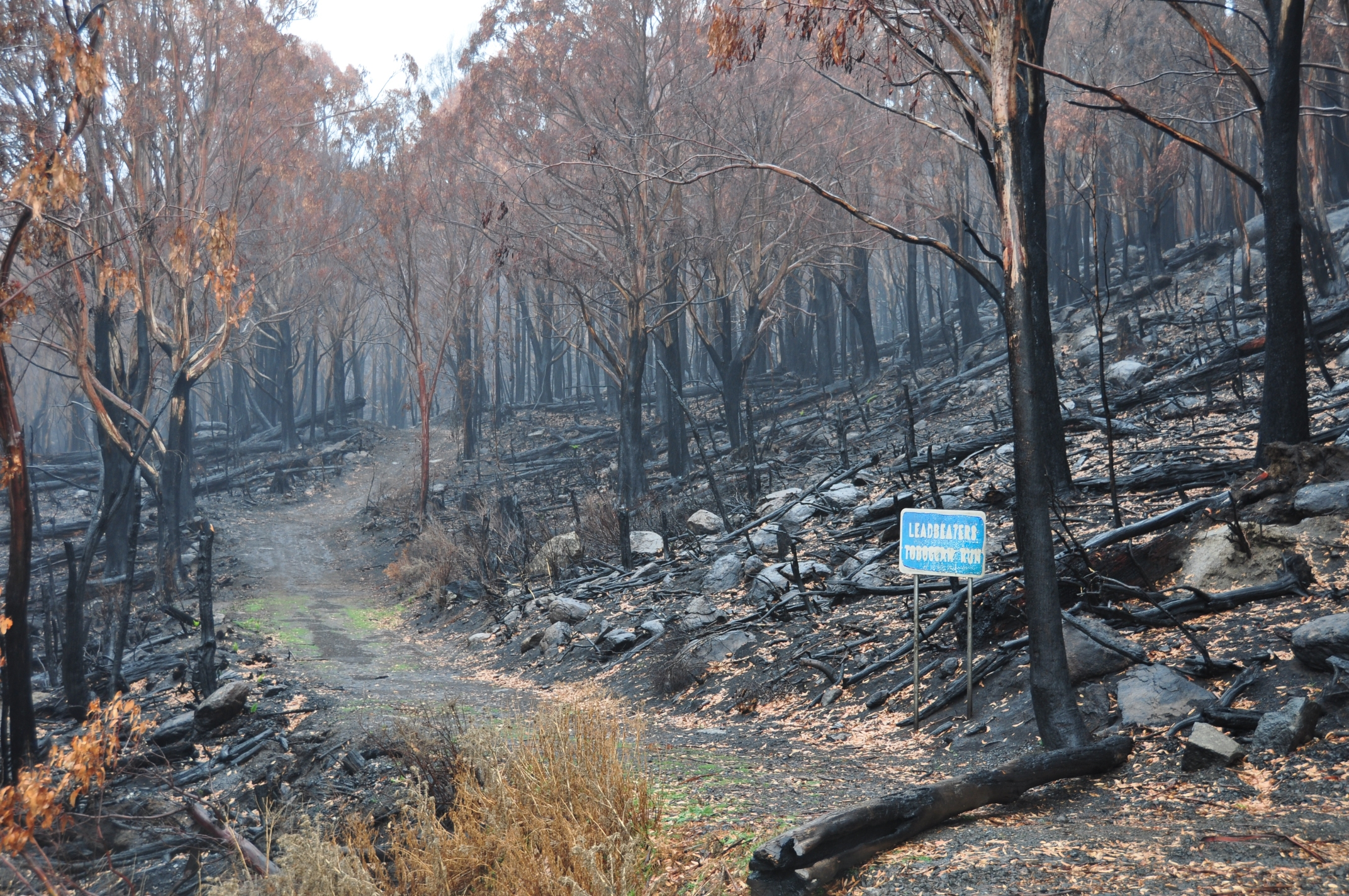
Lake Mountain toboggan run after the fire

According to eyewitnesses, the Murrindindi Mill fire started at 2:55 pm, while Victoria Police twice told the Royal Commission that it commenced at "about 2.30 pm". It burned southeast across the Black Range, parallel to the Kilmore fire, towards Narbethong. Experienced Air Attack Coordinator Shaun Lawlor reported flame heights of "at least 100 metres" as the fire traversed the Black Range. At Narbethong, it destroyed 95 per cent of the town's houses. When the southerly change struck, it swept towards the town of Marysville.

Late in the afternoon of 7 February, residents had anticipated that the fire front would bypass Marysville. At about 5:00 pm, power was lost to the town. Around 5:30 pm, the wind died away, however, minutes later it returned from a different direction, bringing the fire up the valley with it.

Afterwards, a police sergeant said that the main street in Marysville had been destroyed: "The motel at one end of it partially exists. The bakery has survived. Don't ask me how. Everything else is just nuked." Reports on 11 February estimated that around 100 of the town's population of approximately 500 were believed to have perished, and that only "a dozen" buildings were left. Premier Brumby described the situation: "There's no activity, there's no people, there's no buildings, there's no birds, there's no animals, everything's just gone. So the fatality rate will be very high."

Eventually 34 fatalities were confirmed in the Marysville area, with all but 14 of over 400 buildings destroyed. Other localities severely affected included Buxton and Taggerty.

To the south of the fire complex, visitors and residents were stranded at Yarra Glen when fire surrounded the town on three sides. Houses just to the north of Yarra Glen were destroyed and large areas of grassy paddocks burnt.

Investigators initially believed that the cause of the fire that originated near the Murrundindi Mill and swept through Narbethong and Marysville was arson, with several suspects investigated. Later investigations prompted a 2011 declaration that arson had not been responsible.

=== Beechworth fire ===
In Beechworth, a fire burnt over 30,000 hectares (74,000 acres) and threatened the towns of Yackandandah, Stanley, Bruarong, Dederang, Kancoona, Kancoona South, Coralbank, Glen Creek, and Running Creek. The fire ignited from a felled power line at around 6:00 pm on 7 February, 3 km (1.9 mi) south of Beechworth, before being driven south through pine plantations by hot northerly winds.

The fire destroyed an unknown number of buildings at Mudgegonga, southeast of Beechworth, with two residents confirmed dead. Dense smoke and cloud cover had hindered assessment of the Beechworth fire, but as conditions cleared late on 8 February, aerial crews were able to commence surveys of the situation.

Strong winds fuelled the fire on the night of 8 February, and lightning ignited a new fire near Kergunyah around midday on 9 February. More than 440 personnel worked to contain a separate front that threatened Gundowring and Eskdale, having jumped the Kiewa River. Late on the night of 9 February the greatest threat was to Eskdale, and fires also burnt in pine plantations 8 kilometres (5.0 mi) from the large town of Myrtleford, at the western end of the fire area. While smaller towns to the east, including Gundowring and Kergunyah, remained under threat, the CFA said that there was no immediate danger to the larger towns of Beechworth and Yackandandah on the northern fringe of the fire area.

By 10 February, firefighters had completed a 115 km (71 mi) containment line around the Beechworth fire, and sought to construct 15 km (9.3 mi) more, though the fire continued to burn out of control. By that afternoon, threat messages for the area had been downgraded, though firefighters were tackling a separate fire near Koetong, to the east of the main Beechworth fire, of between 50 and 80 ha (120 and 200 acres). Residents of Beechworth and surrounding towns were advised on the evening of 10 February to expect increased smoke cover as 250 firefighters would be undertaking backburning to eliminate fuel within the control lines.

The Beechworth Correctional Centre minimum-security prison offered up to thirty of its inmates to provide assistance to firefighters; a local DSE manager said that though untrained personnel would not be allowed at the fire front, the prisoners would be welcome in support roles.

=== Bendigo fire ===
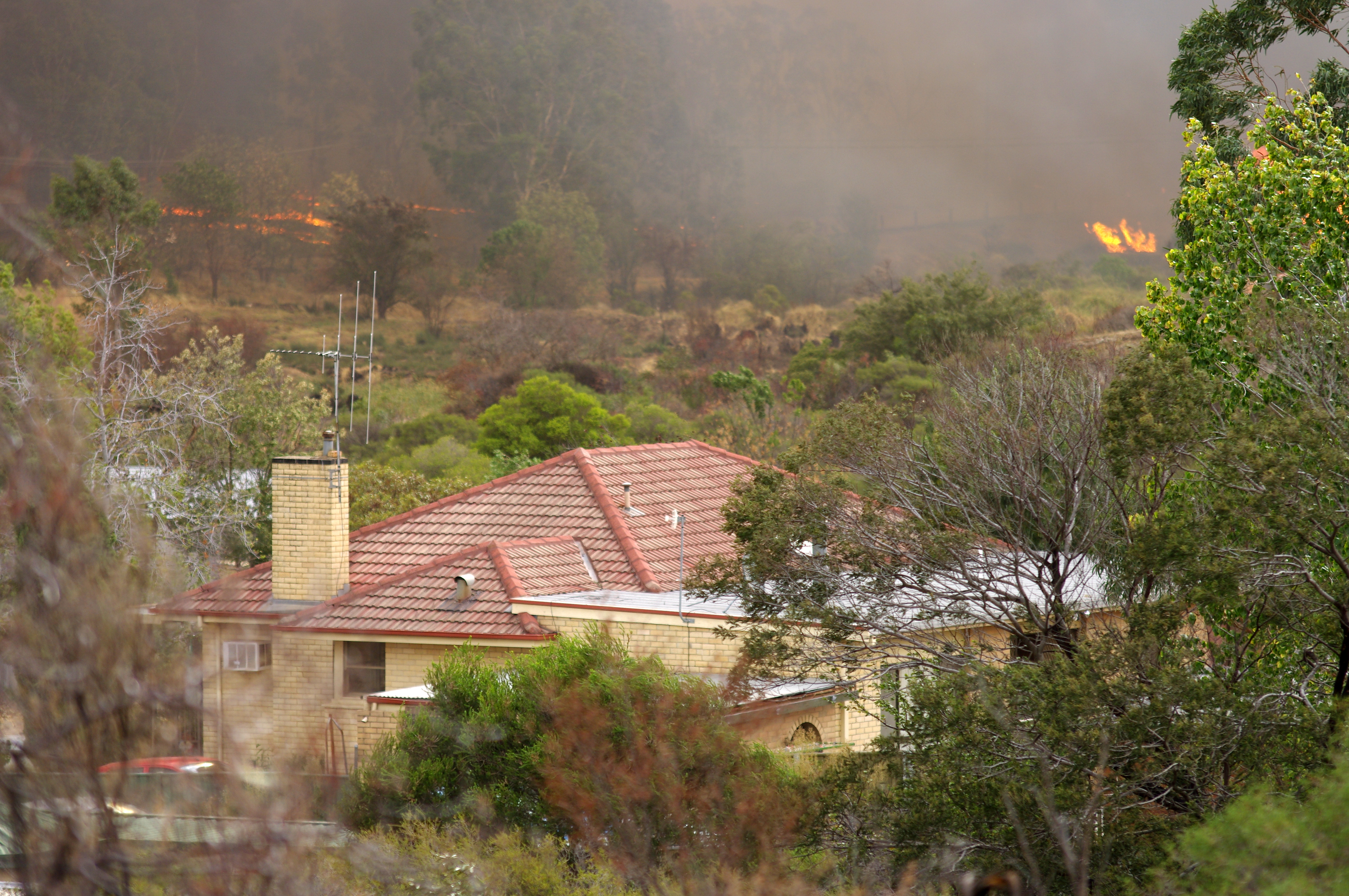
Fire threatening houses near Dean Street in Long Gully, west of Bendigo at 5:52 pm

A fire to the west of the city of Bendigo burned out 500 hectares (1,200 acres). The fire broke out at about 4:30 pm on the afternoon of 7 February, and burned through Long Gully and Eaglehawk, coming within 2 km (1.2 mi) of central Bendigo, before it was brought under control late on 7 February. It destroyed around 61 houses in Bendigo's western suburbs, and damaged an electricity distribution line, resulting in blackouts to substantial parts of the city. One Long Gully resident, ill and confined to his house, was killed in the fire despite the efforts of his neighbours to rescue him. The fire changed direction late on 7 February with the cool change, and headed back towards Eaglehawk; it was contained at 9:52 pm, though it was still burning within containment lines well into the next day.

A relief centre was set up at Kangaroo Flat Senior Citizens Centre. During the fire, residents from Long Gully, Eaglehawk, Maiden Gully, California Gully, and West Bendigo were evacuated and advised to assemble at the centre. A town meeting was held for the affected residents on 8 February. On the same day, Victoria Police indicated that they were investigating whether arson was the cause of the fire.

The CFA initially suspected that the most likely cause was a cigarette butt discarded from a car or truck along Bracewell Street in Maiden Gully. However, the arson squad and local Bendigo detectives spent 9 February investigating the fire scene, and while they could not determine exactly what had caused the fire as of 10 February, they suspected arson. On 10 June 2009, Victoria Police announced that they were 'completely satisfied' that the fire had been deliberately lit.

On 2 February 2010, police announced that the taskforce investigating the arson had arrested two youths in relation to the Bendigo fires. The youths, aged 14 and 15, were each charged with arson causing death, deliberately lighting a bushfire, lighting of a fire on a day of total fire ban and lighting of a fire in a country area during extreme weather conditions. They were also charged with multiple counts of using telecommunications systems to menace, harass and offend as well as 135 counts each of arson.

On 7 November 2011, the Victorian Supreme Court Justice, Paul Coghlan, on advice from the prosecutor, Steven Milesi, found that the two youths were unfit to stand trial before a jury due to their intellectual disabilities.

=== Redesdale fire ===
In Redesdale, southeast of Bendigo, a fire starting 9 km (5.6 mi) west of the town burnt 10,000 ha (25,000 acres) and destroyed twelve houses and various outbuildings. The fire threatened the towns of Baynton and Glenhope. Glenhope was threatened again on 9 February from a smaller fire that broke away from the main front, resulting in extra fire crews being brought in from Bendigo and Kyneton. The fire was contained by 10 February.

=== Bunyip State Park fire ===
A fire started at Bunyip Ridge in the Bunyip State Park on 4 February, originating near walking tracks; it was thought to have been deliberately lit. By 6 February, the fire had burned out 123 hectares (300 acres), and emergency services personnel engaged in fighting the fire feared, despite efforts to establish containment lines in the park, that once the extreme weather conditions of 7 February arrived the fire would escape the confines of the park and threaten surrounding towns.

By the morning of 7 February, the fire had broken through containment lines. According to the DSE incident controller for the fire, the weather conditions deteriorated much more quickly than predicted, stating that "conditions overnight and in the early hours are usually mild, but our firefighters are reporting strong winds and flame heights of five to 10 metres". Ground-based fire crews had to retreat from the fire front as the escalating conditions made firefighting in the bushland terrain impossible. The fire broke out of the park around 4:00 pm, and by 6:00 pm had burnt out 2,400 hectares (5,900 acres) of forest and farmland, threatening the towns of Labertouche, Tonimbuk, Jindivick, Drouin, Warragul and Longwarry, and embers were starting spot fires up to 20 km (12 mi) to the south.

The fire destroyed approximately a dozen houses at Labertouche, Tonimbuk, and Drouin West, in addition to various outbuildings and a factory. The progress of the fire had been stopped by the afternoon of 9 February, though it had burned through 24,500 hectares (61,000 acres). DSE crews conducted backburning operations to ensure containment of the fire on 9 February, warning residents of areas between Pakenham and Warragul about smoke from those fires.

The fire was controlled and co-ordinated at the Pakenham ICC in the Combined Emergency Services building, with CFA and DSE personnel running the operation depending on where the fire was at the time. Pakenham VICSES, who shared the building, also provided assistance during the fire operation.

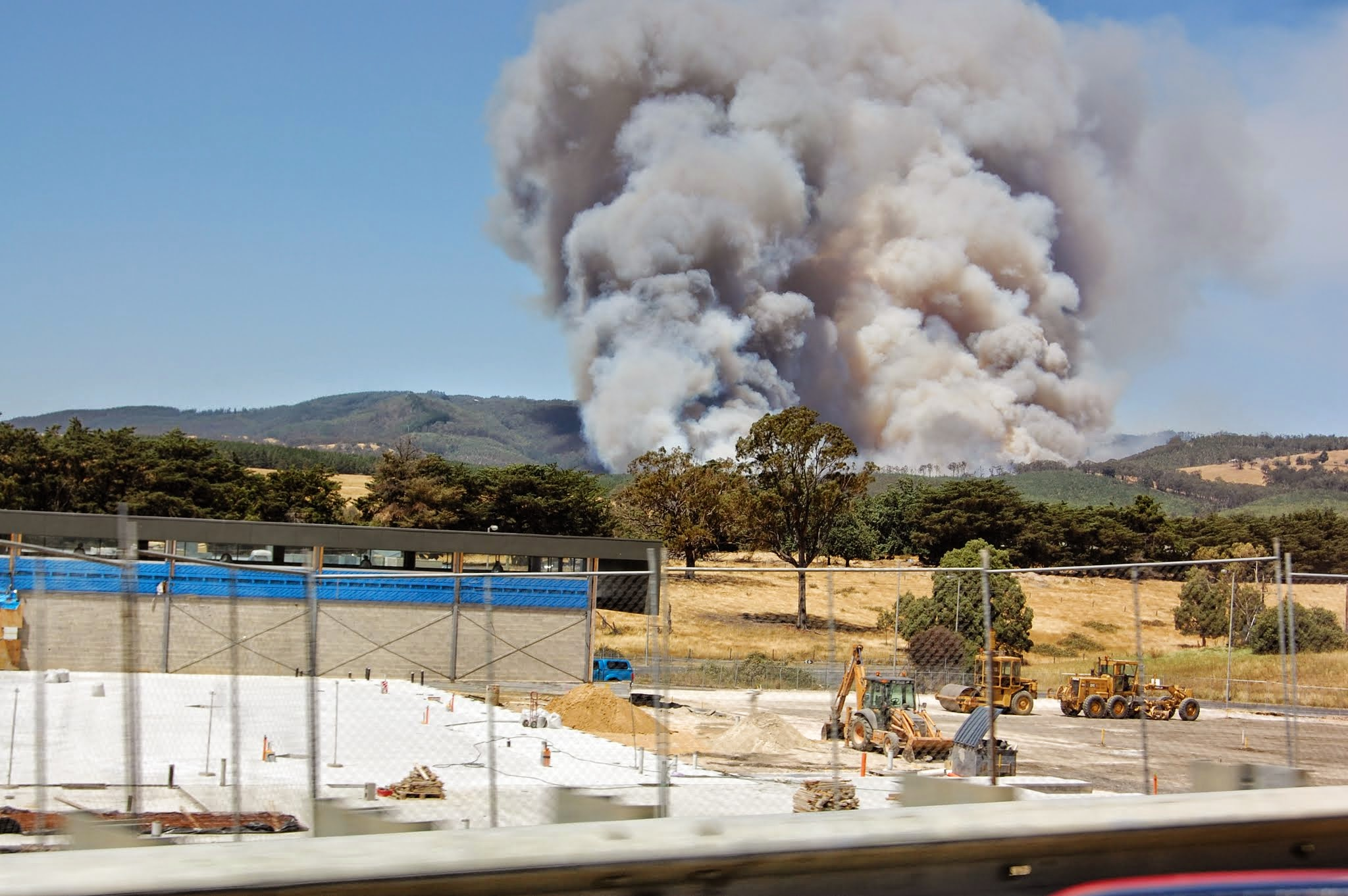
Smoke from the approaching fire front in Churchill, Victoria

=== Central Gippsland fires ===
The Central Gippsland bushfires began in a pine plantation 1 km (0.62 miles) southeast of Churchill at about 1:30 pm on the afternoon of 7 February. Within 30 minutes it had spread to the southeast, threatening Hazelwood South, Jeeralang, and Budgeree East, and by late afternoon the fire was approaching Yarram and Woodside on the south Gippsland coast. The cool change came through the area about 6:00 pm, but the southwesterly winds it brought pushed the fire northeast through Callignee, destroying 57 of its 61 homes. The fire continued on to Koornalla and Traralgon South, and towards Gormandale and Willung South on the Hyland Highway. About 500 evacuees from the area sheltered at an emergency centre established in a theatre in Traralgon.

The fire threatened the Loy Yang Power Station, particularly the station's open-cut coal mine. On the night of 7 February, the fire approached the mine's overburden dump, but did not damage any infrastructure, nor did it affect the station's operations. Several small fires broke out in the bunker storing raw coal from the mine, but were contained with no damage. The threat eased by the evening of 8 February as temperatures cooled and some light rain fell. One small spot fire broke out to the south of the power station, but it was contained by water bombing aircraft.

By 9 February, the Churchill fire complex was still burning out of control, with fronts through the Latrobe Valley and the Strzelecki Ranges. By late that afternoon, the complex had burnt out 32,860 hectares (81,200 acres) and had killed eleven people. Wind changes that evening exacerbated parts of the Churchill complex, causing the CFA to issue further warnings to residents at Won Wron and surrounding areas.

Investigators announced that they strongly believed arson was the most likely cause of the Churchill fire. A man from Churchill, Brendan Sokaluk of Churchill, was arrested by police on 12 February and charged with one count each of arson causing death and intentionally lighting a bushfire. He was convicted of 10 counts of arson causing death and sentenced to 17 years 9 months' imprisonment in April 2012. Sokaluk was released on parole on 30 April 2024 on the condition that he stays at least 80 km away from the town of Churchill.

=== Dandenong Ranges fire ===
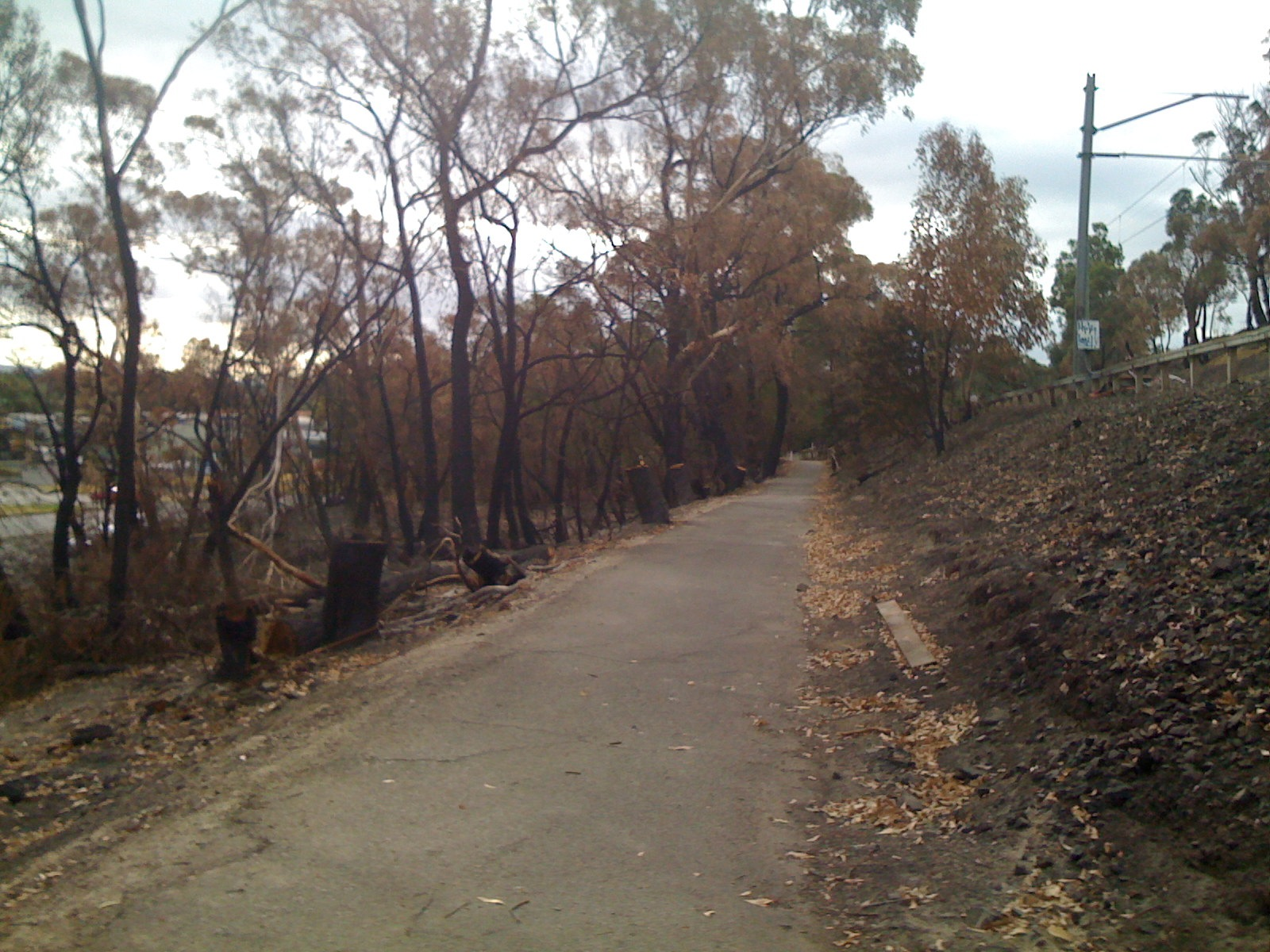
Fire damaged bushland surrounds the Ringwood – Belgrave Rail Trail in Upper Ferntree Gully

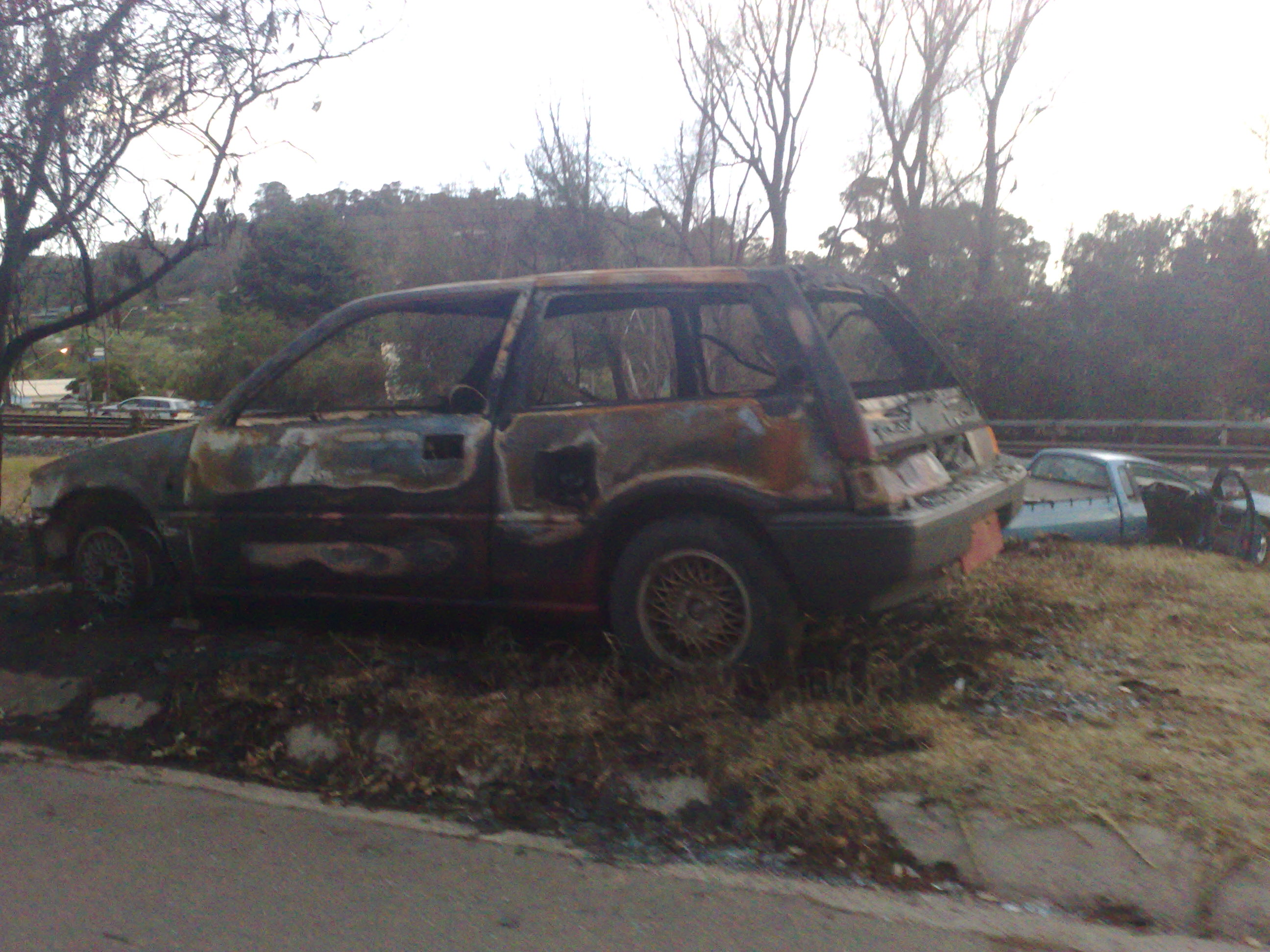
A car burnt as a result of the Upper Ferntree Gully fires

In Upper Ferntree Gully a fire damaged the rail track and caused the closure of the Belgrave railway line, as well as all major roads. The fire, which was contained by CFA crews within three hours, burned at least 2 ha (4.9 acres) along the railway.

In the southern Dandenong Ranges, bushfires ignited around Narre Warren, one of which was caused by sparks from a power tool. Six homes were destroyed in Narre Warren South and three in Narre Warren North.

In the weeks following Black Saturday, fires were started in bushland along Terrys Avenue in Belgrave (which was quickly contained and extinguished by the CFA), and Lysterfield State Forest in Upwey. Amongst the damage was the almost new Upper Ferntree Gully CFA Tanker 1.

=== Wilsons Promontory fire ===
On 8 February lightning sparked a fire in Wilsons Promontory which burned more than 11,000 ha (27,000 acres). This fire posed no immediate threat to campers, but due to excessive fuel and inaccessibility authorities chose to evacuate the park, with some campers being evacuated by boat.

At a community meeting on 11 February, DSE and Parks Victoria authorities revealed a plan to back-burn across the entrance to the promontory, in order to prevent any possibility of the fire burning out of the park and into farmland and towards the towns of Yanakie and Sandy Point. Crikey reported that locals were divided on the merits of the plan, some concerned as to why the back-burning had not been carried out earlier, and some worried at the large scale of the proposed burns, which were reported to be larger than both the existing fire as well as the April 2005 fires that affected the park Strong easterly winds on 12 February forced authorities to postpone the proposed burns lest they themselves pose a danger to surrounding communities, though they did proceed with preparatory work.

=== Maroondah/Yarra fires ===
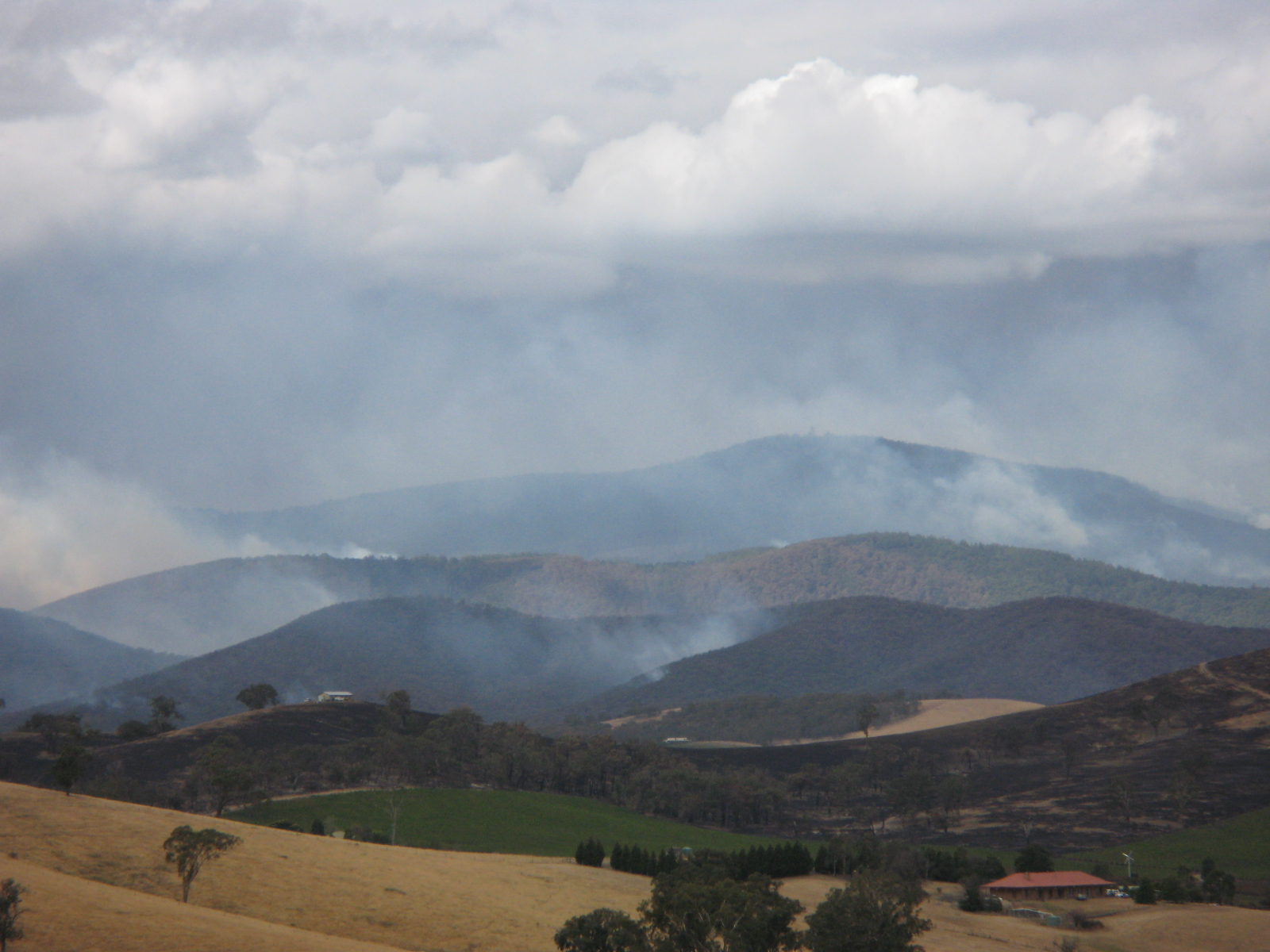
Part of the Maroondah/Yarra complex, east of Yarra Glen, on 10 February

The Maroondah/Yarra complex was a combination of several fires that had earlier been burning to the east of Healesville and Toolangi on 10 February, as part of the greater Kilmore East – Murrindindi complex south. By late that morning, the complex had burned out 505 hectares (1,250 acres), with 184 personnel and 56 tankers responding to the fires. A CFA spokesperson said that while temperatures had cooled, strong winds were proving problematic, with towns in the area being threatened by embers blown from the fires. Around midday, the immediate threat to property in the areas around Healesville was downgraded, though a DSE spokesperson said that residents should be mindful of localised changes in the weather.

=== Horsham fire ===
The Horsham fire burnt 5,700 ha (14,000 acres), including the golf club and eight homes. Two firefighters from the Dimboola brigade narrowly escaped when their ute was engulfed by fire.

The fire was ignited at 12:30 pm on 7 February when strong winds initiated the failure of a 40-year-old tie wire, felling a power line at Remlaw, west of the city. The fire spread southwest and then southeast, across the Wimmera Highway and Wimmera River, to the Horsham Golf Course, and then to Haven, south of the city. Firefighters managed to save the general store, town hall and school at Haven, though flames came within metres of those buildings. Winds of up to 90 km/h (56 mph) changed direction three times throughout the day, producing conditions described by the local CFA incident controller as the worst he had ever seen. To the southwest of Horsham an 82-year-old woman in a wheelchair and her daughter were collected from her house by a taxi when the fire was no more than 100 m (110 yd) away; the house was alight as the taxi drove off, and burned down within minutes.

At 3:00 pm more than 400 personnel were engaged in fighting the fire, as well as two water-bombing aircraft, 54 CFA tankers, and 35 DSE units. By 6:00 pm the front had moved east, and a wind change then pushed it northeast across the Western Highway to Drung, east of Horsham.

=== Coleraine fire ===
Shortly before 12:30 pm on 7 February 2009 a fire started on farmland, 5 km (3.1 mi) northwest of Coleraine in western Victoria. In gusting winds, a corroded tie wire holding a 48-year-old single wire earth return (SWER) conductor to an insulator failed due to metal fatigue. The insulator was atop Pole 3 37°34′51.7″S 141°38′28.8″E on the 12,700-volt Colfitz North spur line. The galvanised steel conductor swung free in the wind, suspended by poles 2 and 4, a span of 540 m (1,770 ft). It is not believed to have touched the ground, but was pushed into a nearby eucalyptus tree by the strong prevailing wind.

Burning gumleaves fell to the ground and ignited grass, from which the fire grew extremely rapidly in the hot, dry and windy conditions. Over 230 firefighters, with 43 appliances and two water bombing aircraft, worked to contain the fire which burnt 770 ha (1,900 acres). The fire destroyed one house, two haysheds, three tractors, the Coleraine Avenue of Honour, and 200 km (120 mi) of fences, as well as injuring livestock, but firefighters were able to save six other homes, including that of the parents of Victorian Premier John Brumby.

The fire threatened to burn through the township, but a wind change around 2:00 pm pushed the fire to the northeast instead. The regional CFA operations officer said of the wind change that "[a]ll that happened within about an hour and we were lucky; we thought it would go through Coleraine, but it headed off at the last minute." At about 6:00 pm the fire was controlled.

A local man was badly burned while helping a farmer move livestock out of harm's way; the man was caught when the same wind change that saved the town pushed the fire in his direction, and he suffered burns to 50% of his body, but recovered.

=== Weerite fire ===
At Weerite, east of Camperdown, a fire burnt 1,300 ha (3,200 acres), and damaged the rail line between Geelong and Warrnambool. Approximately 3,000 sleepers were burnt across a 4 km (2.5 mi) section of track. The rail line was re-opened by 16 February.

The fire caused unquantified losses of stock, and destroyed several outbuildings, but all houses under threat were saved by CFA firefighters. The fire is thought to have been started by sparking from felled power lines along the Princes Highway, which carried restricted speeds for a short time due to the heavy smoke in the area.

== Investigations ==
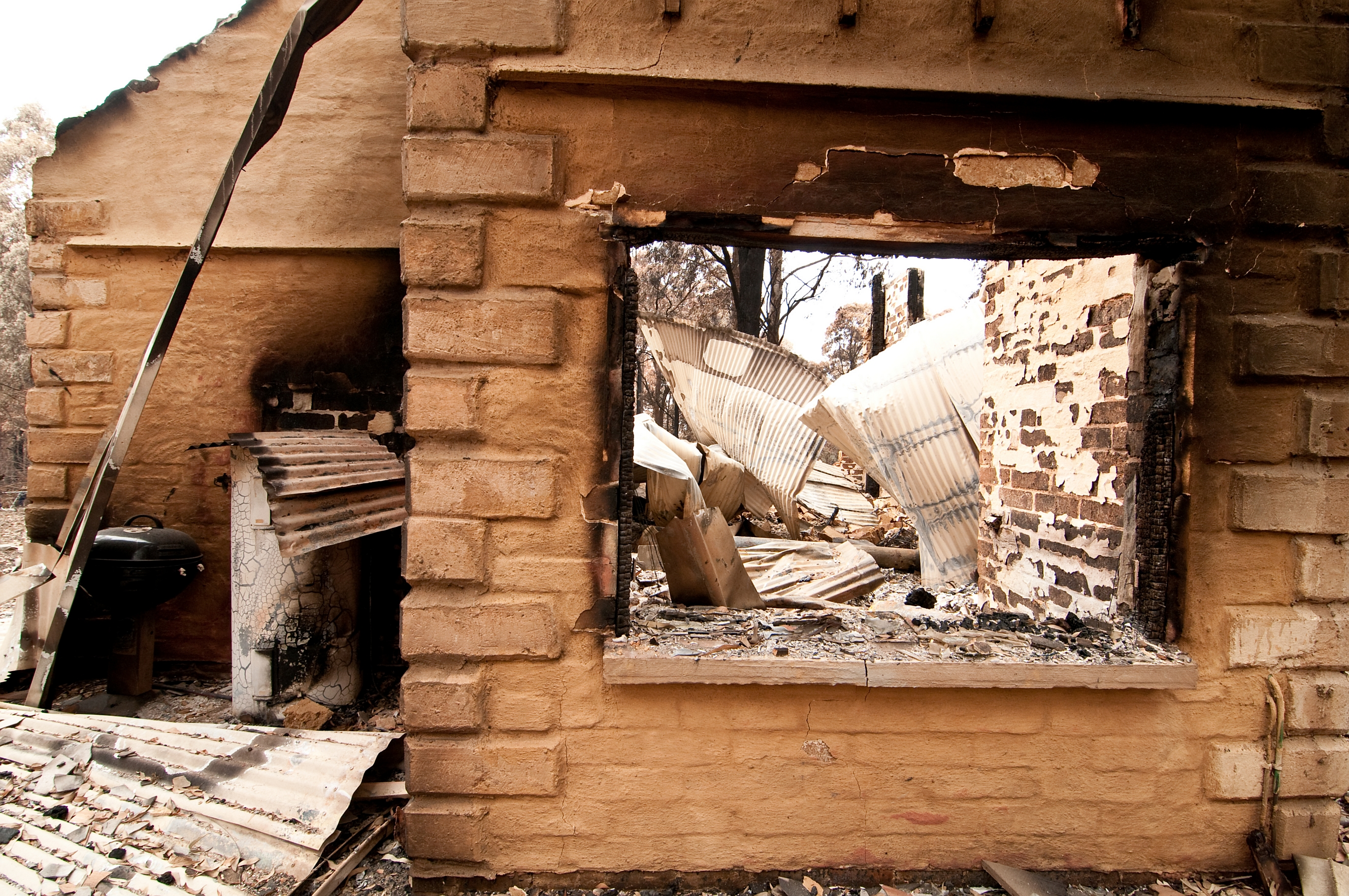
Property destroyed by fire at Kinglake after the Black Saturday bushfires

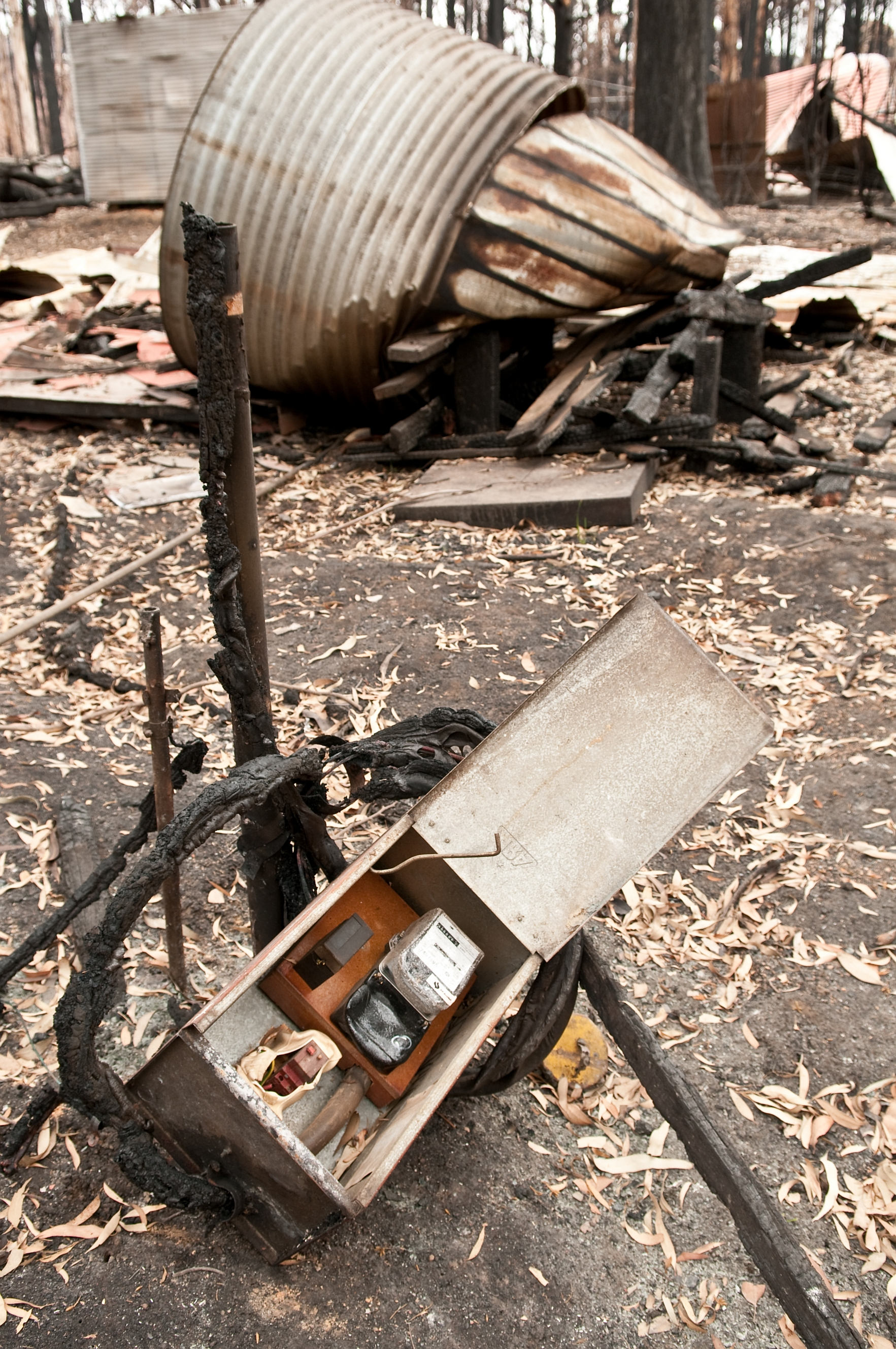
Remains of a destroyed property at Kinglake after the Black Saturday bushfires

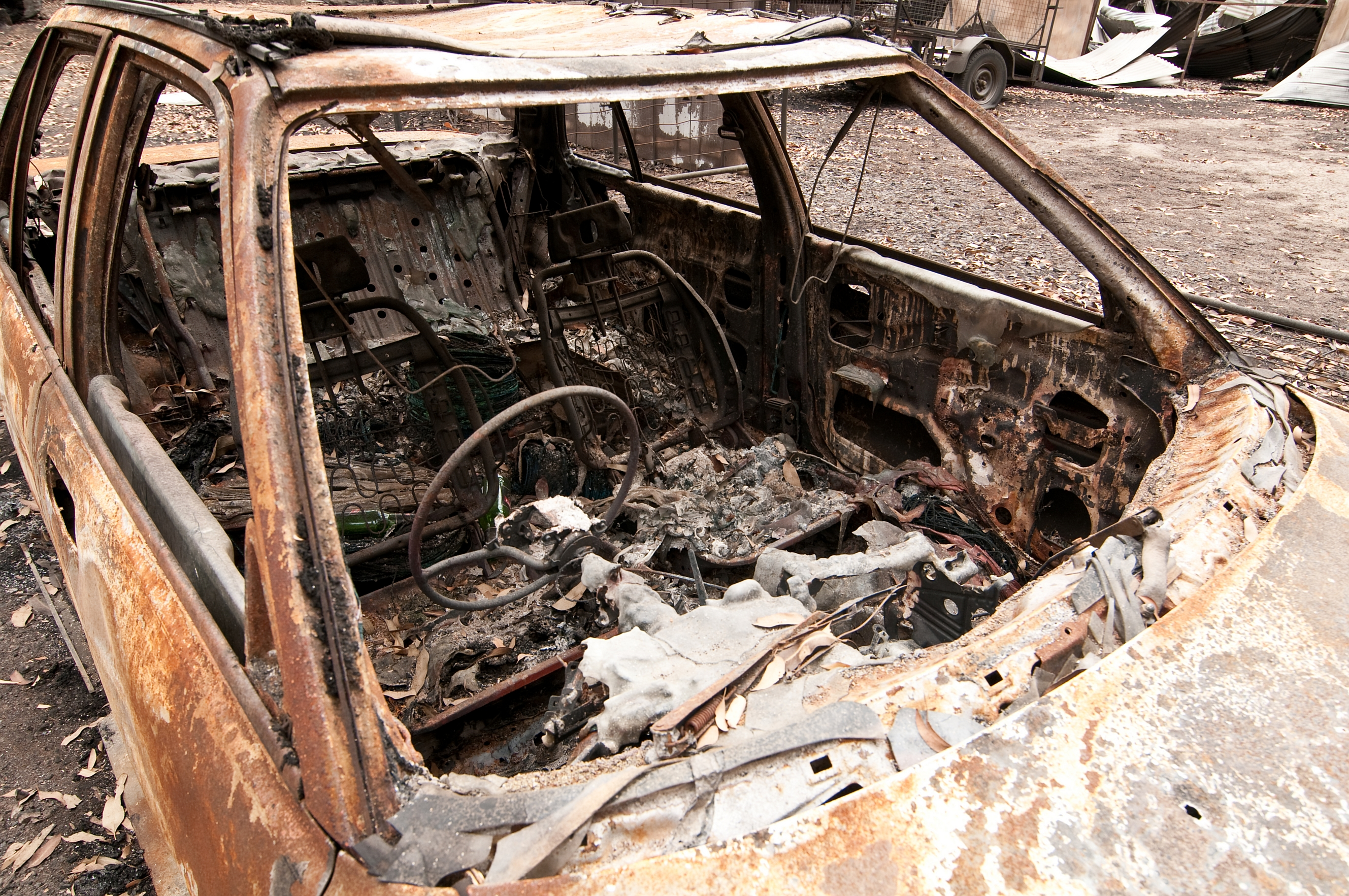
A burnt-out car at Kinglake after the Black Saturday bushfires

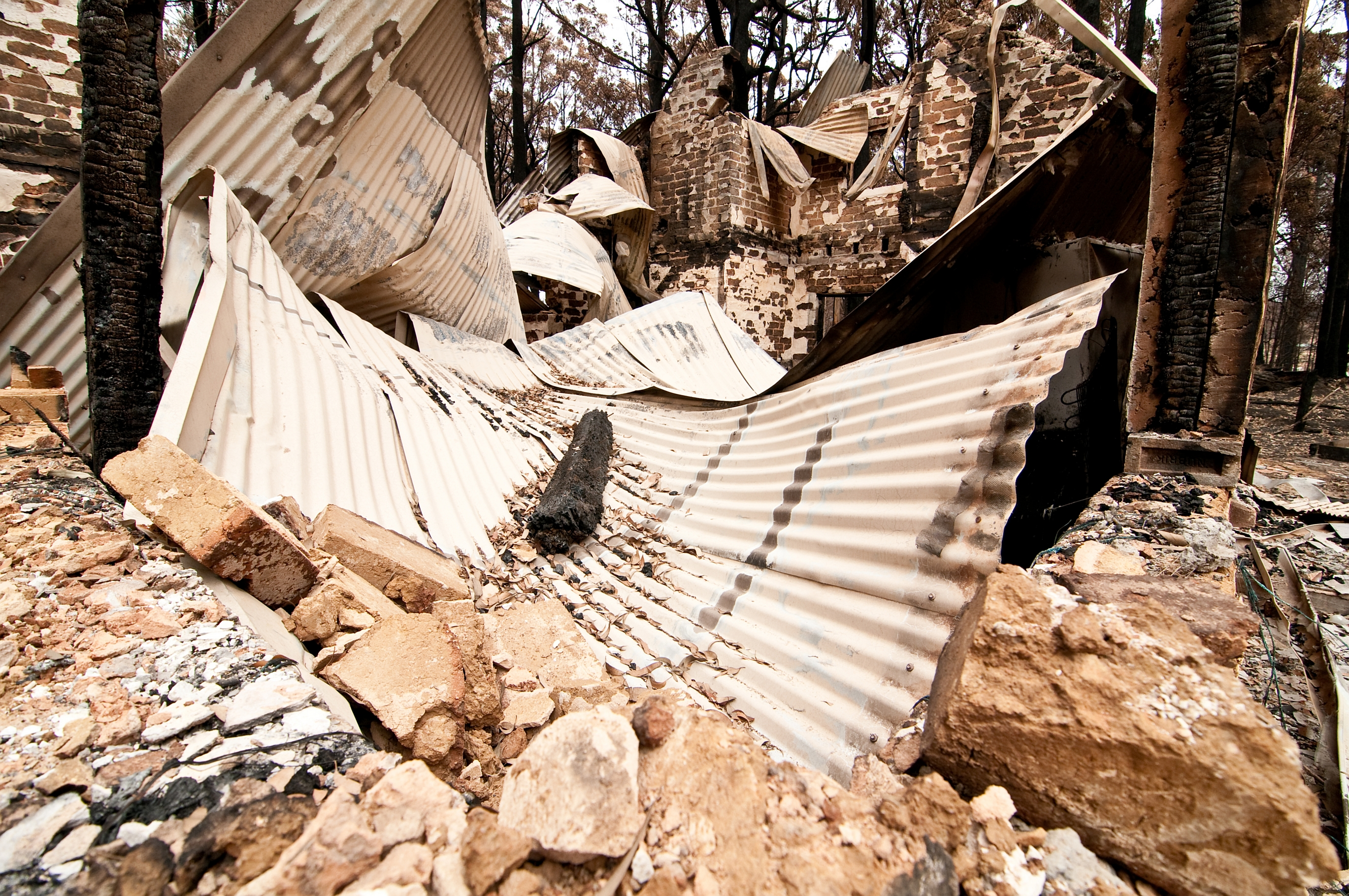
Destroyed property at Kinglake after the Black Saturday bushfires

Investigations began almost immediately following the fires to determine a wide variety of things, including identification of victims, cause of ignition sources, and assessments of authority responses. A royal commission into the Black Saturday bushfires was conducted, a process that was intended to determine the true nature of the background causes, preparation of responsible agencies, circumstances on the day, chronology, and impacts of the events in question.

=== Forensic ===
Chief Commissioner of Victoria Police, Christine Nixon, formed a taskforce to assist in identifying victims, coordinated by Inspector Greg Hough. Around forty police from interstate and overseas assisted with Disaster Victim Identification (DVI). The police were sourced from the Australian Federal Police, Tasmania, New South Wales, South Australia, Queensland, Northern Territory, Western Australia, New Zealand, and Indonesia. New Zealand police also provided four victim identification dogs and handlers.

=== Criminal ===
==== Arson ====
Some of the fires were suspected to have been deliberately lit by arsonists. Chief Commissioner Nixon stated on 9 February 2009 that all fire sites would be treated as crime scenes.

On 9 February a man was arrested in connection with the fires at Narre Warren; it was alleged by police that he had been operating a power tool, sparks from which ignited a grass fire, destroying two houses. On 12 February, two people were arrested in connection with the fires, having been observed by members of the public acting suspiciously in areas between Yea and Seymour; however, they were subsequently released without charges being laid.

A man from Churchill, Brendan Sokaluk, was arrested by police on 12 February, in relation to the Churchill fires, and was questioned at the Morwell police station, before being charged on 13 February with one count each of arson causing death, intentionally lighting a bushfire, and possession of child abuse material. At a file hearing in the Magistrates' Court in Melbourne on 16 February the man was remanded in custody ahead of a committal hearing scheduled for 26 May. Following the hearing, a suppression order on the 42-year-old man's identity was lifted, though the order remained in force with respect to publishing his address or any images of him. Despite the order, several members of the public obtained his photograph from his MySpace profile and published it on the social networking website Facebook along with his home address, and others made threats of violence against him. The man's lawyer said that, as a consequence of that information being published, threats were made against the man's family. The man's ex-girlfriend and her family were also harassed after the Herald Sun newspaper published a photograph and a story about her. On 17 February, after requests from Victoria Police, the man's MySpace profile was removed; Facebook commenced deleting postings containing threats, and deleted a photo from one group.

==== Looting ====
By the morning of 11 February 2009, reports of looting had been posted. Witnesses reported seeing acts of looting occurring at a property at Heathcote Junction, shortly after the removal of the body of a victim from the property. That evening, via a report on ABC Local Radio, a number of residents of Kinglake who had been allowed back into the area to inspect the damage, revealed that a "Looters Will Be Shot" sign had been posted in the town, after a number of suspicious people and vehicles were seen moving through the town. On 12 February, a small number of arrests were made, and charges laid against people in relation to "looting offences", as announced by the Victoria Police chief commissioner, Christine Nixon.

=== Royal commission ===
The Premier of Victoria, John Brumby, announced in April 2009 that a royal commission into the fires would be held which would examine "all aspects of the government's bushfire strategy".

== Casualties ==
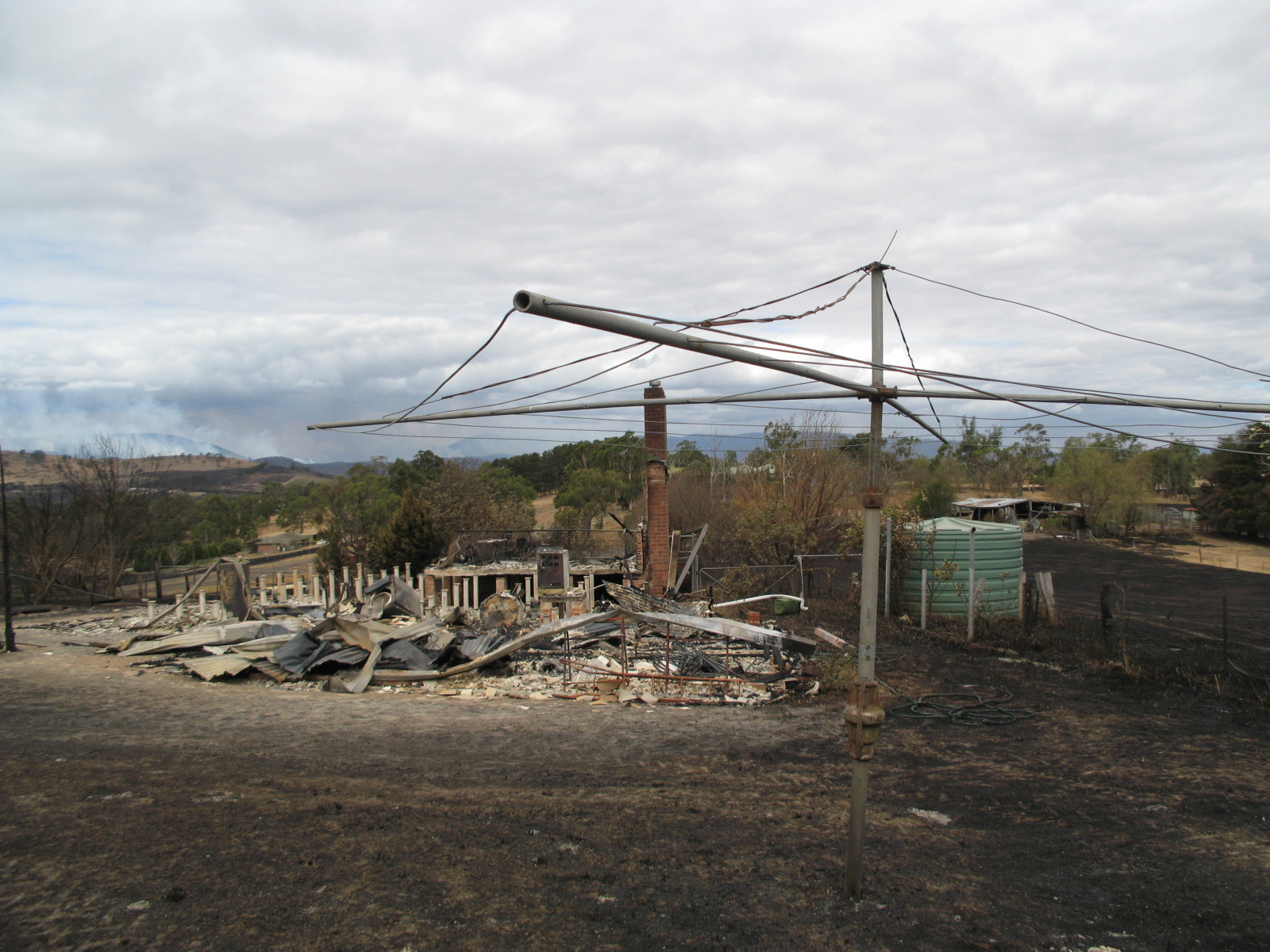
Bushfire damage to property just north of Yarra Glen, with just the Hills Hoist left standing

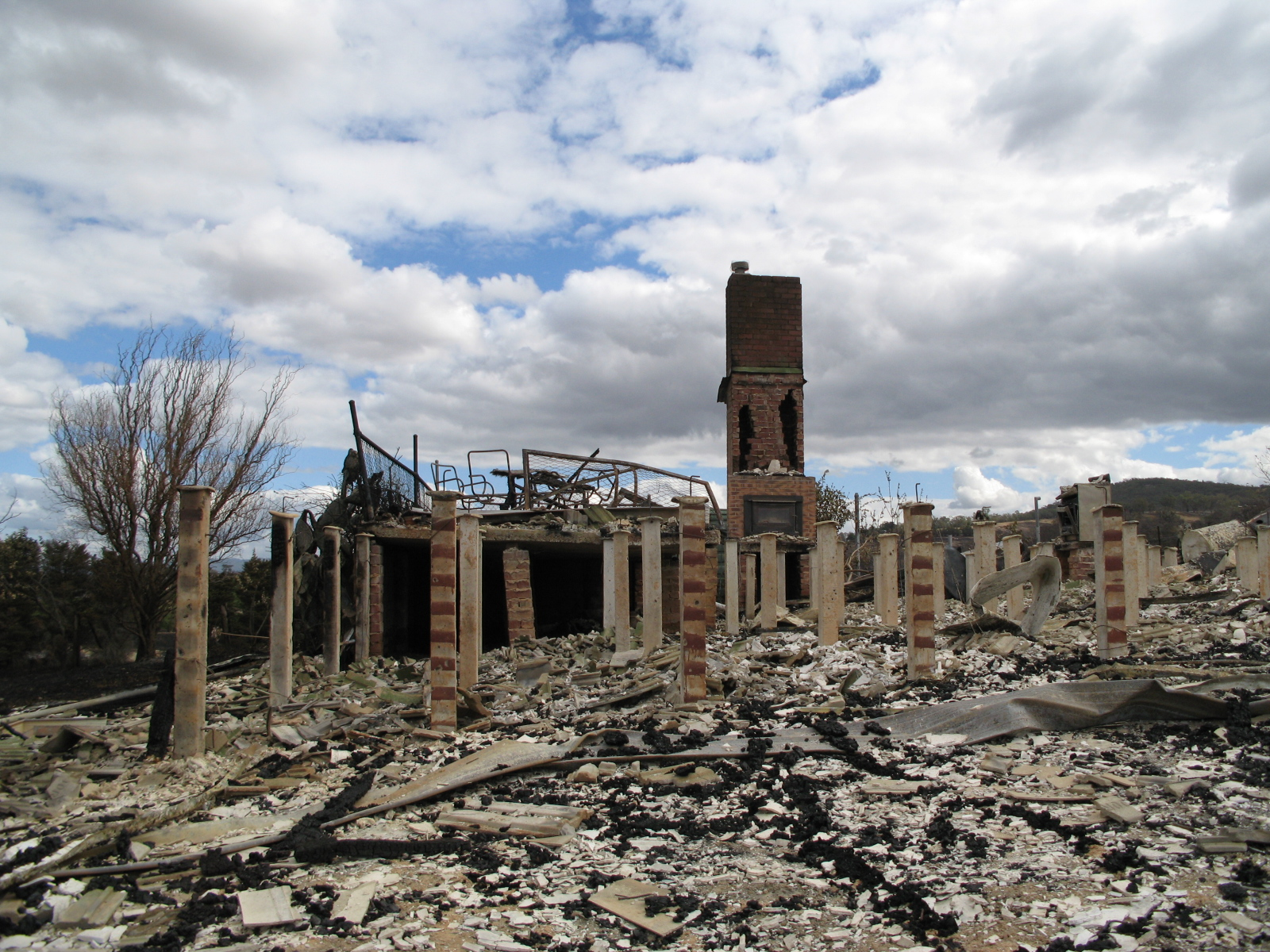
Bushfire damage to property just north of Yarra Glen

A total of 173 people were confirmed to have died as a result of the fires. The figure was originally estimated at 14 on the night of 7 February, and steadily increased over the following two weeks to 210. It was feared that it could rise as high as 240–280, but these figures were later revised down to 173 after further forensic examinations of remains, and after several missing people were located.

A temporary morgue was established at the Coronial Services Centre at Southbank, capable of holding up to three hundred bodies. The Victorian Coroner compared this to a similar facility established after the July 2005 London bombings. By the morning of 10 February 101 bodies had been transported to the temporary morgue. The Victorian Institute of Forensic Medicine stated that it could be impossible to positively identify many of the remains.

On 11 February, fire authorities estimated that as many as 100 of Marysville's 519 residents could have perished. By 16 February, over 150 forensic investigators were engaged in searching the ruins of Marysville. A senior lecturer in fire ecology from the University of Melbourne estimated that the fires may have been burning at temperatures of 1,200 °C (2,190 °F), and concluded that, as a result, the remains of some people caught in the fires may have been obliterated. The final death toll for Marysville was later downgraded to 34 after a large group of residents who remained unaccounted for were officially located.

Among the dead in the Kinglake West area were former Seven Network and Nine Network news anchor Brian Naylor, and his wife Moiree. Veteran TV actor Reg Evans and his partner, artist Angela Brunton, residing on a small farm in the St Andrews area, also died in the Kinglake area fire. Ornithologist Richard Zann perished in the Kinglake fire, together with his wife Eileen and daughter Eva.

=== Fatalities ===
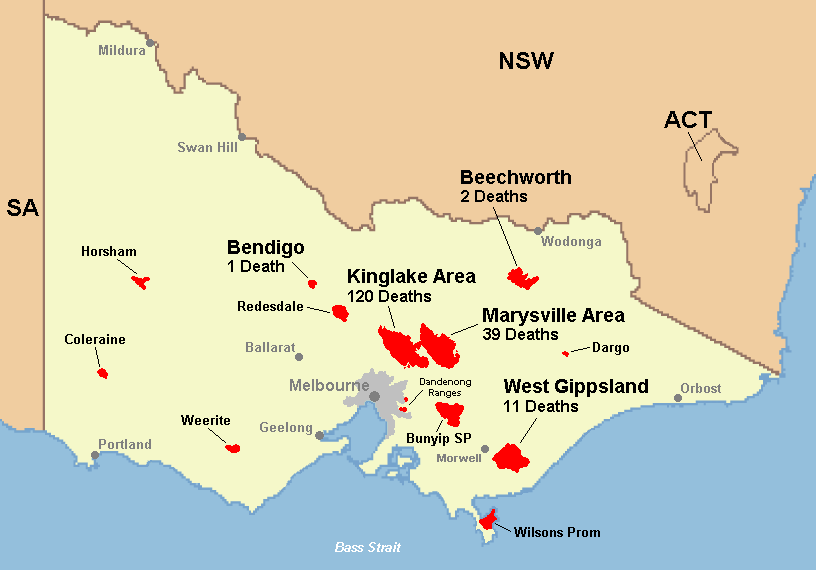
Map of affected areas and number of casualties in each area

General statistics

- 161 people died in the fires themselves, 12 died later in hospital, and 4 died from other causes including car crashes
- Out of the 173 deaths, 100 were male, 73 were female.
- There were 164 Australians, 9 foreign nationals, killed in the bushfires. The foreign nationals comprised citizens of:
  - Greece (2)
  - Indonesia (2)
  - Philippines (2)
  - Chile (1)
  - New Zealand (1)
  - United Kingdom (1)
- 7 of the deaths occurred in bunkers of both fire-specific and non-fire-specific design.
- 1 firefighter, David Balfour, 47, from Gilmore, ACT, was killed near Cambarville on the night of 17 February, when a burnt-out tree fell on him as he attached a hose to a fire tanker.

Location of deaths:

- Inside houses (113)
- Outside houses (27)
- In vehicles (11)
- In garages (6)
- Near vehicles (5)
- On roadways (5)
- Attributed to or associated with the fire but not within fire location (4)
- On reserves (1)
- In sheds (1)

Locality of deaths:

Kinglake/Whittlesea Area (120)

- Kinglake (38)
- Strathewen (27)
- St Andrews (12)
- Steels Creek (10)
- Hazeldene (10)
- Humevale (6)
- Kinglake West (4)
- Flowerdale (2)
- Whittlesea (2)
- Toolangi (2)
- Arthurs Creek (2)
- Clonbinane (1)
- Heathcote Junction (1)
- Strath Creek (1)
- Upper Plenty (1)
- Yarra Glen (1)

Marysville Area (39)

- Marysville (34)
- Narbethong (4)
- Cambarville (ACT firefighter) (1)

Central Gippsland (11)

- Callignee (4)
- Koornalla (4)
- Churchill (2)
- Jeerralang Junction (1)

Beechworth (2)

- Mudgegonga (2)

Bendigo (1)

- Eaglehawk (1)

Total
173

=== Injuries ===
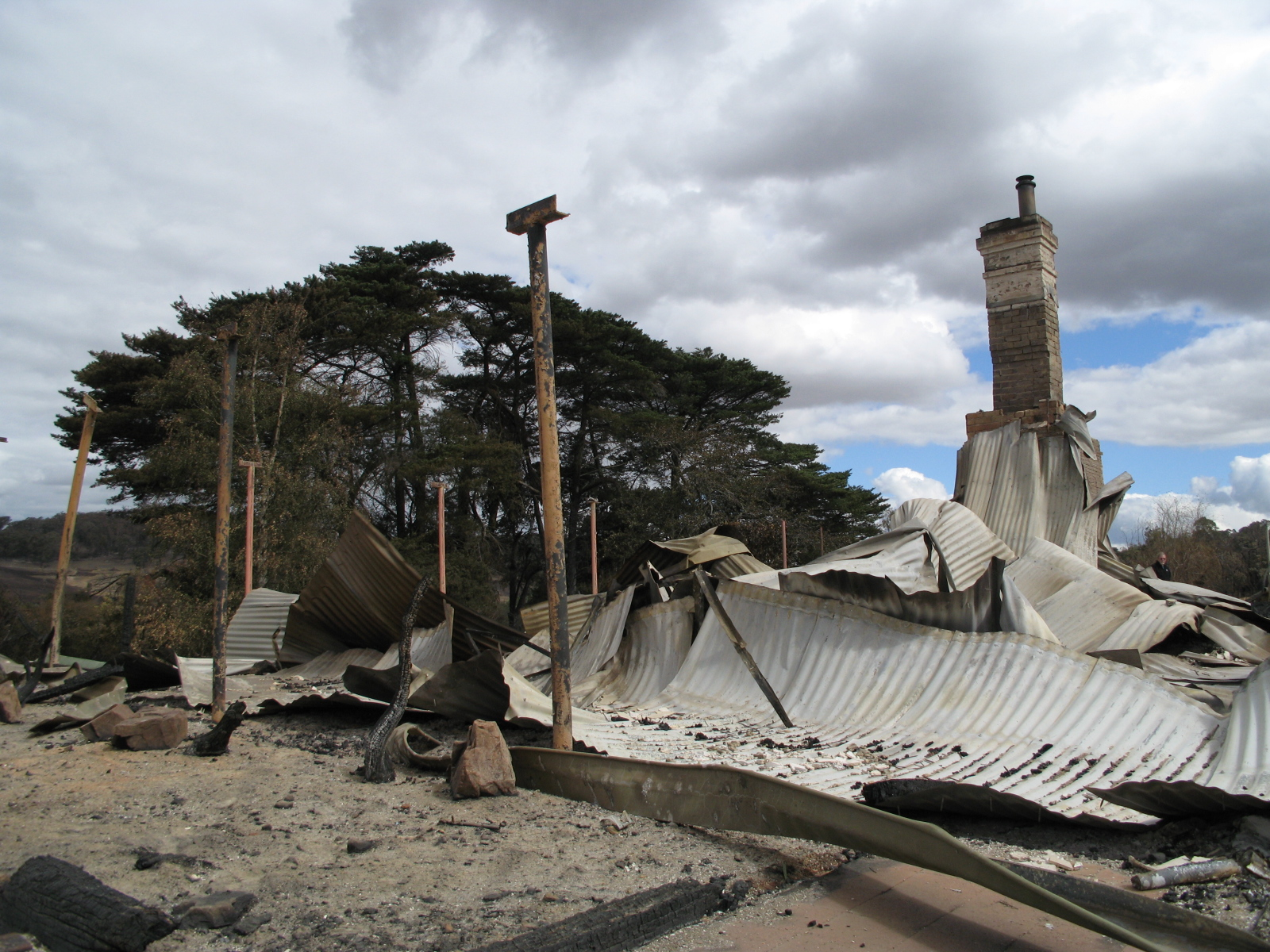
Bushfire damage to property in Steels Creek

A total of 414 people were injured during the Black Saturday bushfires. Due to the intensity and speed of the fires, most casualties of the bushfires either died, or survived with minor injuries. There were significantly fewer major burns than in previous bushfires, such as Ash Wednesday. Of the people who presented to medical treatment centres and hospitals, there were 22 with serious burns and 390 with minor burns and other bushfire-related injuries.

National and statewide burns disaster plans were activated. Twenty-two patients with major burns presented to the state's burns referral centres, of which eighteen were adults. One patient admitted to the Royal Children's Hospital and two at The Alfred Hospital died from their injuries. Adult burns patients at The Alfred spent 48.7 hours in theatre in the first 72 hours. There were a further 390 bushfire-related presentations across the state in the first 72 hours. Most patients with serious burns were triaged to, and managed at, burns referral centres. Throughout the disaster, burns referral centres continued to have substantial surge capacity.

== Overall statistics ==
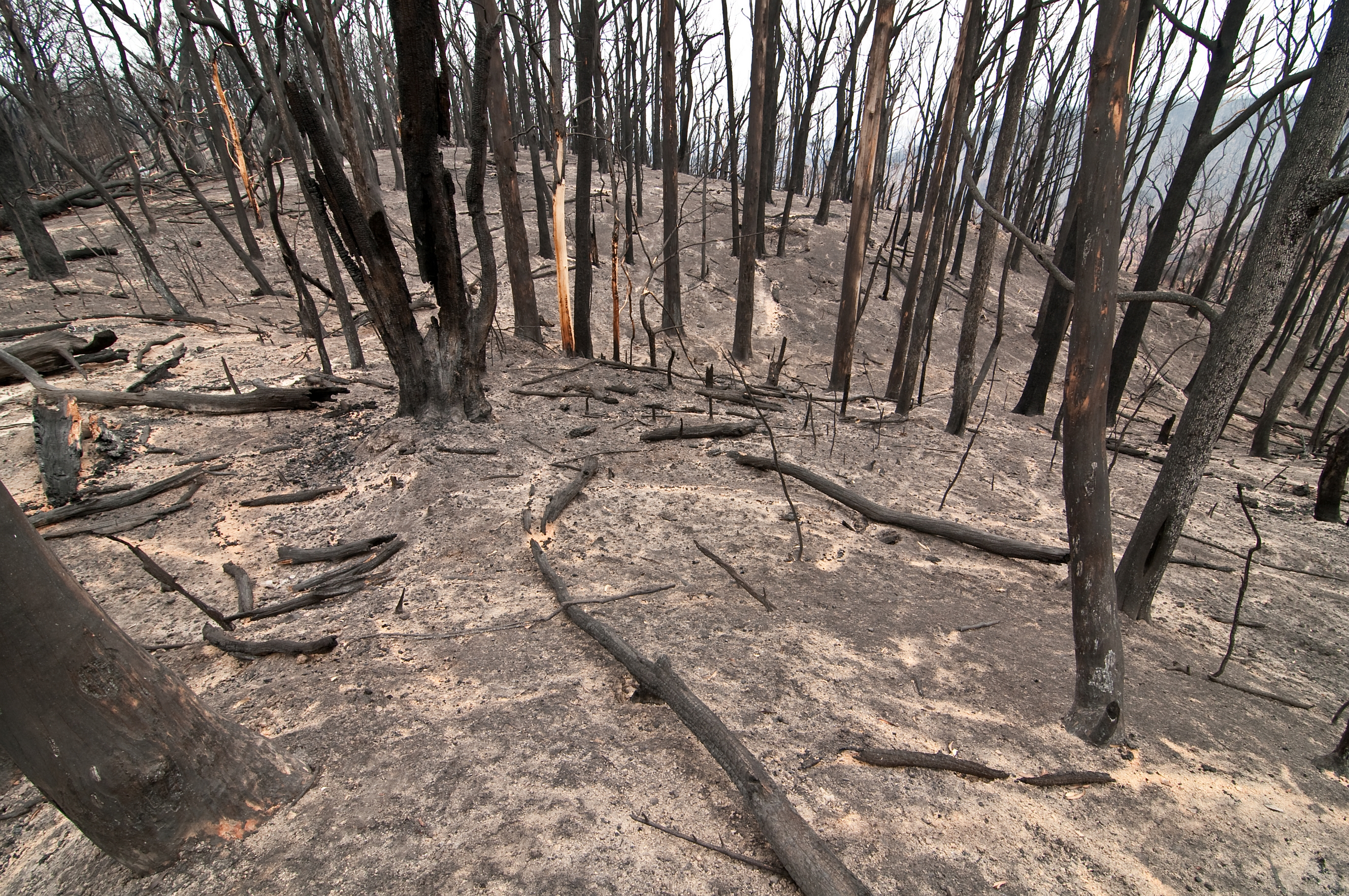
The Kinglake National Park after the Black Saturday bushfires

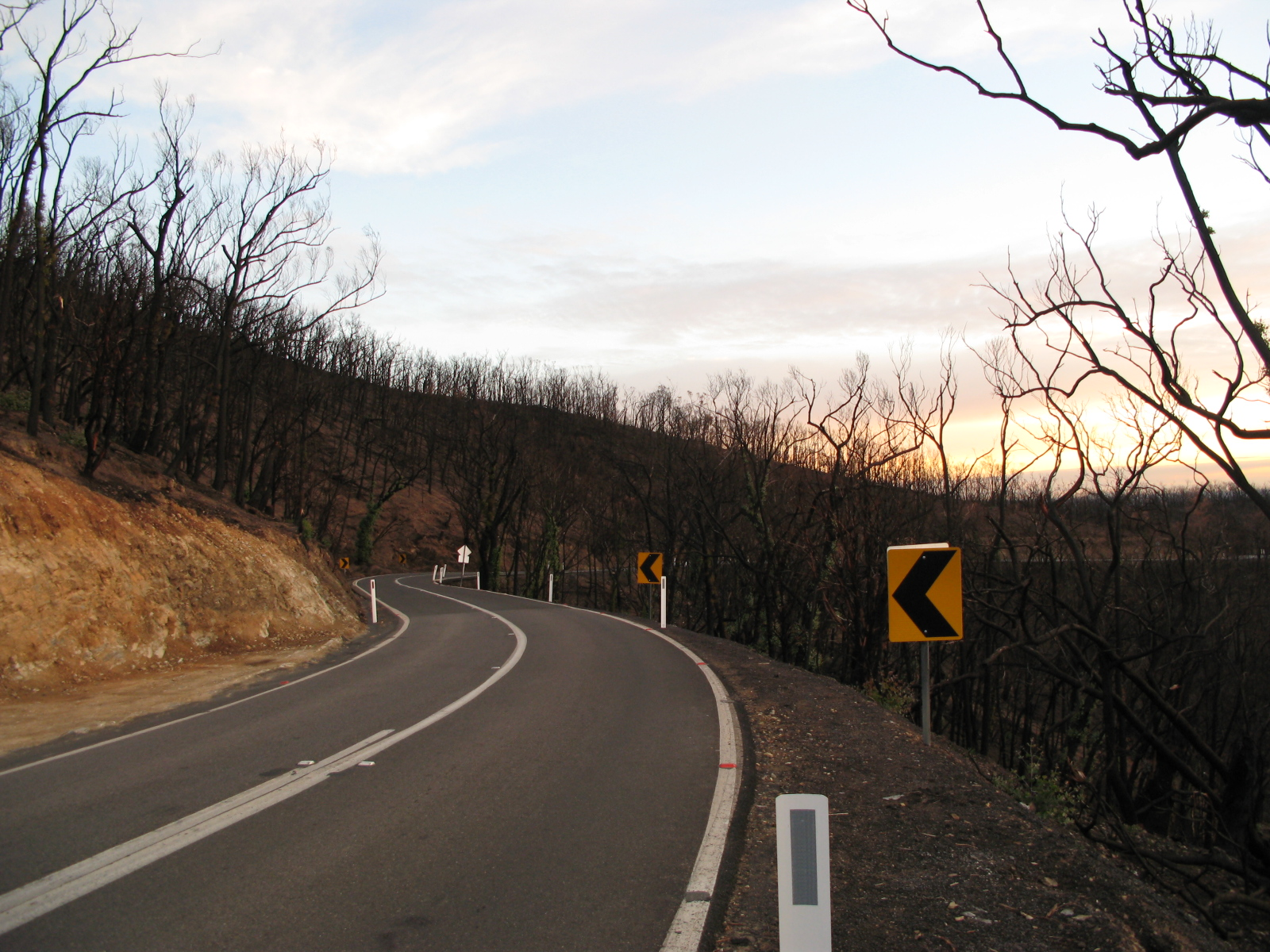
The St. Andrews-Kinglake Road, one of the few roads out of the fire area, two months after the bushfires

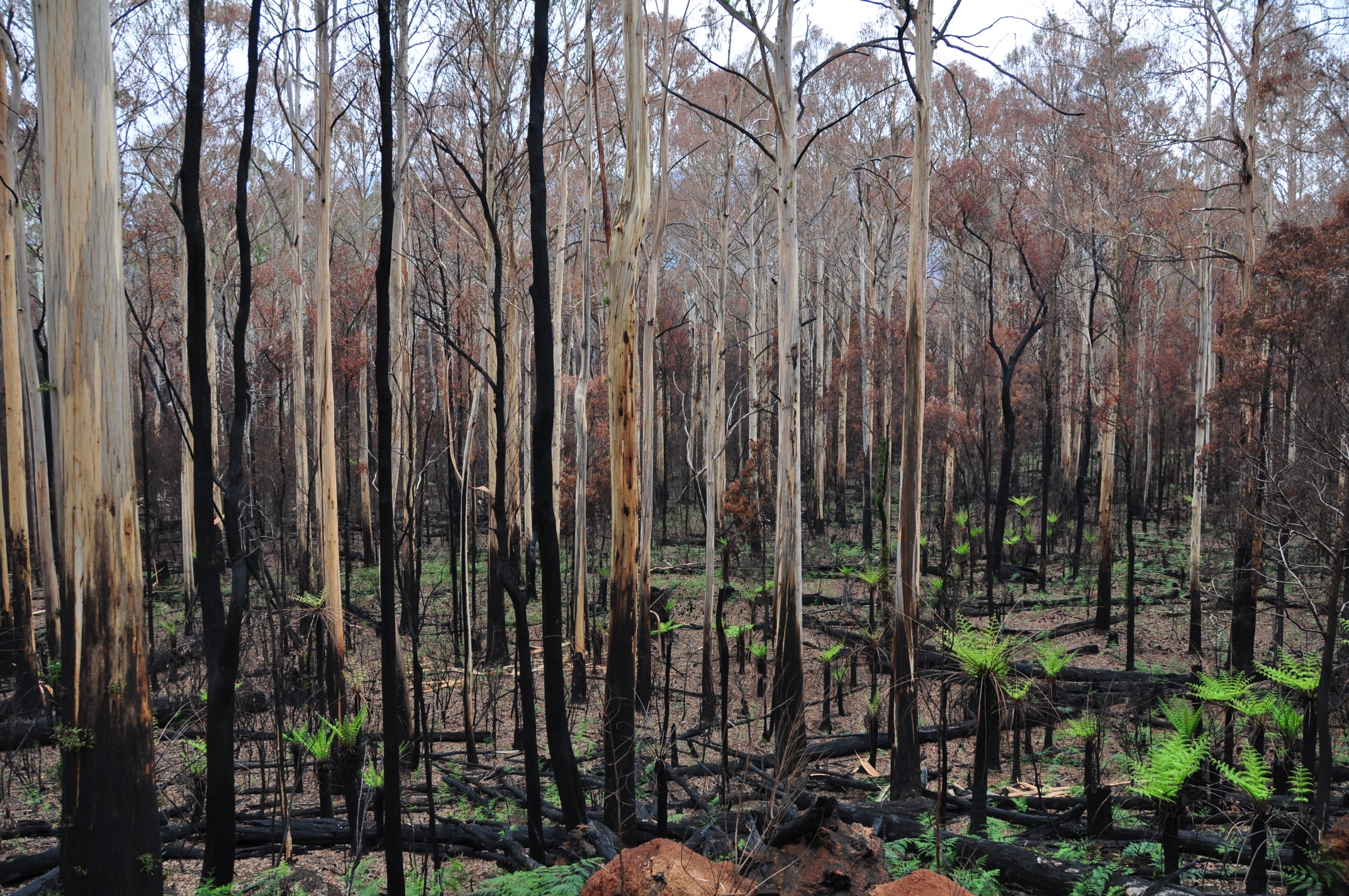
Forest regrowing along Acheron Way in April 2009

It was estimated that the amount of energy released during the firestorm in the Kinglake-Marysville area was equivalent to the amount of energy that would be released by 1,500 Hiroshima-sized atomic bombs.

Beyond the casualty list detailed above, physical damage caused by the bushfires included:

- 450,000 ha (1,100,000 acres) burnt
- 7,562 people displaced
- Over 3,500 structures destroyed, including:
  - 2,029+ houses
  - 59 commercial properties (shops, pubs, service stations, golf clubs, etc.)
  - 12 community buildings (including 2 police stations, 3 schools, 3 churches, 1 fire station)
  - 399 machinery sheds, 363 hay sheds, 19 dairies, 26 woolsheds, 729 other farm buildings
- Agricultural and horticultural losses:
  - Over 11,800 head of livestock, consisting of 2,150 sheep, 1,207 cattle, and an unknown number of horses, goats, alpacas, poultry, and pigs
  - 25,600 tonnes (25,200 long tons; 28,200 short tons) of stored fodder and grain
  - 32,000 tonnes (31,000 long tons; 35,000 short tons) of hay and silage
  - 190 ha (470 acres) of standing crops
  - 62,000 ha (150,000 acres) of pasture
  - 735 ha (1,820 acres) of fruit trees, olives and vines
  - Over 10,000 kilometres (6,200 mi) of boundary and internal fencing destroyed or damaged
  - 7,000 ha (17,000 acres) of plantation timber
- 98,932 ha (244,470 acres) of parks damaged, 90 percent of which was national park. It was claimed that 950 local parks, 70 national parks and reserves, and over 600 cultural sites and historic places were impacted or destroyed
- 3,921 ha (9,690 acres) of private bushland
- Over 55 businesses destroyed
- Electricity supply was disrupted to 60,000 residents
- Several mobile phone base stations and telephone exchanges damaged or destroyed

=== Damage by locality ===
Summary of damage by locality
Area	Area (ha)	Fatalities	Buildings destroyed	Ignition source	Fire name/origin
Kinglake Area	180,000+	120	1,244 houses, many commercial buildings	Power lines	Kilmore East fire
Marysville Area	150,000+	39	590 houses, many commercial buildings	Break in an electrical conductor on a power pole near the Murrindindi Saw Mill	Murrindindi Mill fire
Central Gippsland	32,860+	11	247 houses	Arson	Churchill-Jeeralang fire
Beechworth	30,000+	2	38 houses	Power lines	Mudgegonga fire
Bunyip State Park	24,500	0	24 houses, several other buildings	Arson/lightning suspected	Bunyip State Park fire
Wilsons Promontory	11,000+	0	None	Lightning	–
Redesdale	10,000	0	12 houses, several outbuildings	Unknown	–
Horsham	5,700	0	8 houses, several other buildings	Power lines	Remlaw fire
Weerite	1,300	0	Several outbuildings	Power lines	–
Coleraine	770	0	1 house, several outbuildings	Power lines	–
Maroondah/Upper Yarra	505	0	None	Spotting	Maroondah/Yarra complex
Bendigo	384	1	61 houses, 125 sheds and outbuildings	Arson	Maiden Gully/Bracewell Street fire
Dandenong Ranges	5+	0		Unknown, machinery	Upper Ferntree Gully fire
Totals	450,000+	173	3,500+ (2,029+ houses)		

== Responses ==
Responses to the Black Saturday bushfires included immediate community response, donations, and international aid efforts. Later responses included Government inquiries including a Royal Commission, and recommendations and discussions from a wide variety of bodies, organisations, authorities and communities.

In September 2009 it was announced that Australia's most prominent fire ecologist, Kevin Tolhurst, was developing a new course for the University of Melbourne on fire behaviour. Later that month the City of Manningham announced it was developing the state's first integrated fire management plan in conjunction with the interim findings of the Royal Commission. It is expected that eventually all Victorian councils responsible for both urban and rural land will need to develop such plans, which define fire risks in open space areas, along major roads, and in parkland.

In September/October 2009, it was announced that a new fire hazard system would replace the previous one. The new system involves a six-tier scale to indicating such things as the level of risk and activity of the fire. This standardised Fire Danger Rating (FDR) was subsequently adopted by all Australian states in late 2009. Every day during the fire season the Bureau of Meteorology (BOM) forecasts an outlook of the Fire Danger Index (FDI) by considering the predicted weather including temperature, relative humidity, wind speed, and dryness of vegetation. On the highest risk days, residents are advised to leave the potentially affected areas.

The RSPCA estimated that over a million animals perished in the bushfires. Additionally, many of the surviving wildlife suffered from severe burns. For example, large numbers of kangaroos were afflicted with burned feet due to territorial instincts that drew them back to their recently burned and smouldering home ranges. The affected area, particularly around Marysville, contains the only known habitat of Leadbeater's possum, Victoria's faunal emblem, putting this species under further threat.

Forested catchment areas supplying five of Melbourne's nine major dams were affected by the fires, with the worst affected being the Maroondah Reservoir and O'Shannassy Reservoir. As of 17 February 2009, over ten billion litres of water had been shifted out of affected dams into others.

In early March 2009, smoke from the fires was discovered in the atmosphere over Antarctica at record altitudes.

=== Economic impact ===
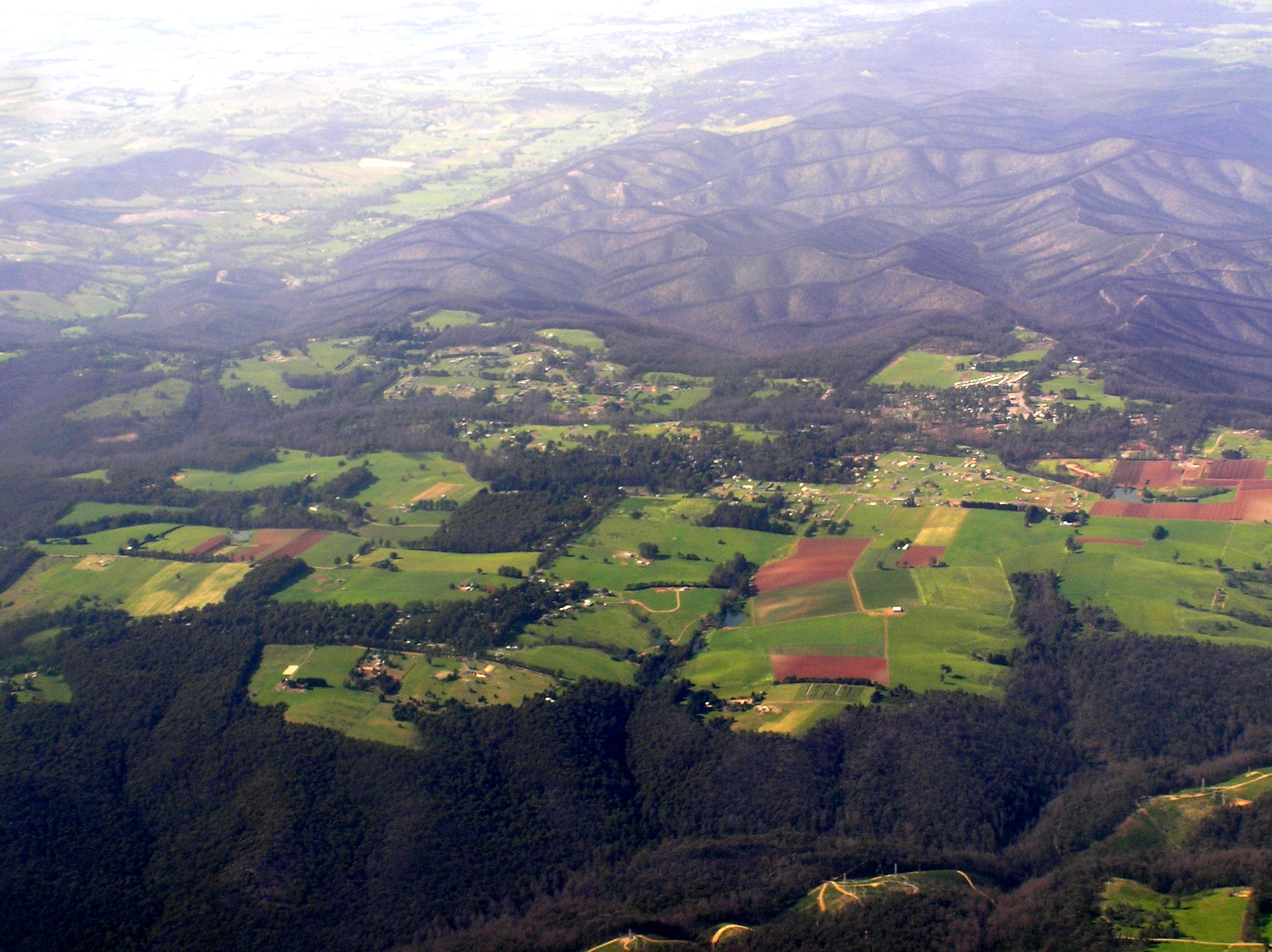
Aerial view of the Kinglake area looking north, nine months after bushfires (burnt area top third of image)

The Bushfires Royal Commission gave a "conservative" estimate of the total cost of the Black Saturday bushfires of $4.4 billion. This figure included a value of $645 million placed on the 173 lives lost using an accepted method the government uses to value lives, however did not include any assessment of the cost of the injuries received.

The largest contributor to the total cost was insurance claims, which the Insurance Council of Australia reported as $1.2 billion as of August 2010. This figure was composed of 84 per cent for property or contents, and 16 per cent for vehicles. However, the report also estimated that up to 13 per cent of residential properties destroyed may have had no insurance, with many more under-insured, thus suggesting that the actual cost of asset damage in the bushfires was considerably higher than that recorded. The report from the commission said that: "... the level of insurance claims is likely to underestimate the true extent of property losses, but it is unable to calculate the extent of this underestimation".

Also omitted from the $4.4 billion figure were the agricultural losses sustained in the fires, and the ongoing impacts on agriculture in following seasons. The Victorian Department of Primary Industries estimated losses shortly after the fires as 11,800 head of livestock, 62,000 hectares (150,000 acres) of grazing pasture, and 32,000 tonnes (31,000 long tons; 35,000 short tons) of hay and silage.

As of February 2011, two years after the fires, the Victorian Bushfire Reconstruction and Recovery Authority stated that based on figures from the end of 2010, permits had been issued for the rebuilding of only 731 of the 1,795, or 41 per cent of the principal places of residence destroyed in the fires.

=== Lawsuits ===
A class action lawsuit was initiated in the Supreme Court of Victoria on 13 February 2009 by Slidders Lawyers against electricity distribution company SP AusNet, in relation to the Kilmore East fire that became part of the Kinglake complex, and the Beechworth fires. A partner at the firm indicated that the claim would centre on alleged negligence by SP AusNet in its management of electricity infrastructure. On 12 February police had taken away a section of power line as well as a power pole from near Kilmore East, part of a two-kilometre section of line that fell on the morning of 7 February and was believed to have started the fire there. The class action was ultimately run by law firm Maurice Blackburn. The action alleged the power company failed to fit a $10 protective device on the power line, which contributed to it breaking and starting the devastating Kilmore East/Kinglake fire. The case settled in December 2014 with a settlement of $494.67 million, the country's largest class action settlement, approved by the Supreme Court of Victoria. (The previous highest payout was $200 Million in Kirby v Centro Properties Limited (No 6) [2012] FCA 650 (19 June 2012).)

In February 2014 a class action trial against SP AusNet by victims of the Marysville blaze was begun in the Supreme Court. It was alleged that the fire was caused by a "break in an electrical conductor on a power pole near the Murrindindi Saw Mill". A$300 million settlement was announced before the trial began. The class action by Murrindindi/Marysville victims was settled in February 2015 for $300 million.

A total of nearly $700 million (after legal expenses) was shared among the claimants of the two highly complex class actions, which were presided over by Justices Jack Forrest and John Dixon. Various other claimants by communities around Coleraine, Horsham, Weerite-Pomborneit, and Beechworth-Mudgegonga also had lawsuits managed by the Supreme Court.

=== Fire policy ===
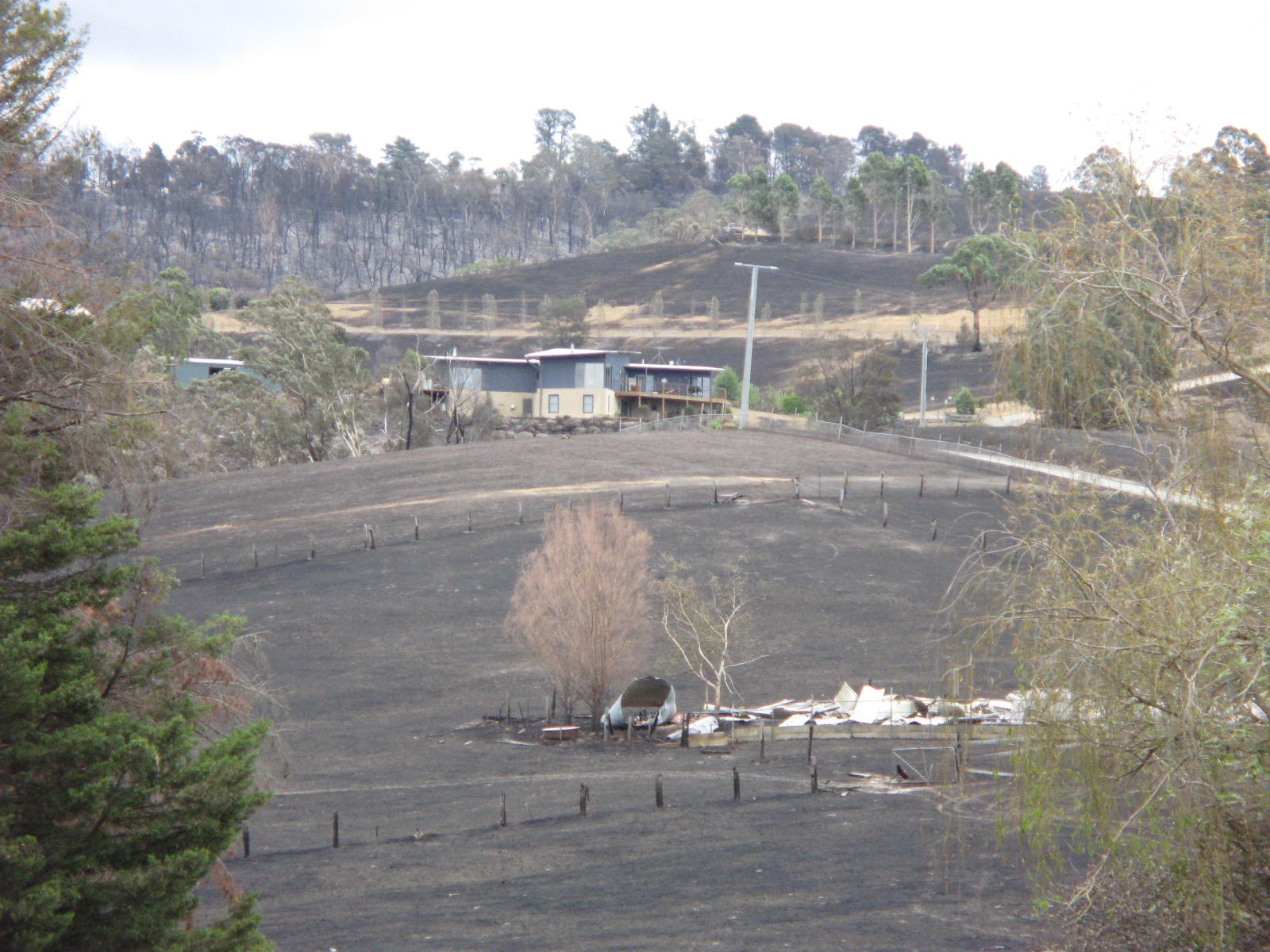
Yarra Glen three days after the fires showing differential property survival

In the wake of the fires and the mounting casualty toll, there was debate about policies for dealing with bushfires and the management practices that may have contributed to them. Naomi Brown, chief executive of the Australasian Fire and Emergency Services Authorities Council, argued that the high number of fatalities in these fires, as opposed to earlier fires such as the Ash Wednesday fires, was partly attributable to increased population densities on Melbourne's fringes. David Packham, bushfire expert and research fellow at Monash University, argued that high fuel loads in bushland led to the destructive intensity of the fires, saying that "There has been total mismanagement of the Australian forest environment."

In announcing that the fires would be investigated by a royal commission, the Premier of Victoria, John Brumby, suggested that the long-standing "stay-and-defend-or-leave-early" policy would be reviewed, saying that while it had proven reliable during normal conditions, the conditions on 7 February had been exceptional. Brumby said that "There were many people who had done all of the preparations, had the best fire plans in the world and tragically it didn't save them."

Commissioner Nixon, however, defended the policy, saying that it was "well thought of and well based and has stood the test of time and we support it". Similarly, Commissioner of the New South Wales Rural Fire Service, Shane Fitzsimmons, said that "Decades of science, practice and history show that a well-prepared home provides the best refuge in the event of fire". Nixon also dismissed potential policies involving forced evacuations, saying "There used to be policies where you could make people leave but we're talking about adults." A former Victorian police minister, Pat McNamara, argued that forced evacuations could have worsened the death toll, as many of the dead appeared to have been killed while attempting to evacuate the fire areas by car.

=== Building codes ===
In response to the Black Saturday bushfires new building regulations for Victorian bushfire-prone areas were fast tracked by Standards Australia. Through the Department of Planning and Community Development the Victorian government has published a range of new guidelines and standards for bushfire planning and building.

Based on this information, the Building Commission Victoria has released a range of publications to assist with people returning to properties, moving into temporary dwellings, retrofitting existing dwellings, and building new dwellings in bushfire areas. The new standard states that all properties (not just those in bushfire areas) will now require a "bushfire attack assessment", and will be given a Bushfire Attack Level (BAL) rating that outlines the type of construction required. The BAL takes into consideration such factors as the Fire Danger Index, the slope, and surrounding vegetation. BALs range from "BAL-LOW", for properties with no specific construction requirements such as suburban buildings, to "BAL-FZ" for properties in the fire zone likely to experience direct exposure to the fire front, as well as high heat flux and ember attacks.

While a draft national building code for bushfire-prone areas proposed using 1,000 K (730 °C; 1,340 °F) as the standard for the assumed temperature to which houses are subject when hit by bushfire, fire engineers argued that standards should be based on a 1,090 K (820 °C; 1,500 °F) temperature. This was in line with existing New South Wales building laws for bushfire-prone areas, although the temperature of fires can actually peak at approximately 1,600 K (1,330 °C; 2,420 °F). The Australian Building Codes Board incorporated the 1,090 K (820 °C; 1,500 °F) temperature in the standard, with the support of the CFA and Australasian Fire Authorities Council.

==== Banning housing in highest risk areas ====
As part of the building codes debate, an expert panel recommended in 2010 that the state government ban housing in the highest fire risk areas, which are some of the most dangerous in the world. Michael Buxton, a professor at RMIT University, said that after the 1983 Ash Wednesday fires the government bought back tens of thousands of lots across the Dandenong Ranges because they were in extremely high fire risk areas; he backed another similar large-scale buyback scheme to move people away from unacceptably high risk areas.

Another member of the panel, international planning expert Roz Hansen, said that she was "disappointed and alarmed" about the decision to rebuild Marysville, stating that it was unlikely that a new development would have been permitted in the area. She went on to say that in parts of Asia, people had been forcibly moved out of unacceptably high risk cyclone and flooding areas in the public interest despite the difficulties this involved.

== See also ==
- Ash Wednesday bushfires
- Black Friday (1939)
- Black Saturday firestorm (Wildfire case study)
- Fire weather
- Utility-caused wildfires
- List of disasters in Australia by death toll
- List of major bushfires in Australia
- List of wildfires
- Recloser
- Sam the Koala
- 1967 Tasmanian fires
- 2008–09 Australian bushfire season
- 2019–20 Australian bushfire season
