= Ballarat Energy Storage System =

- Country: Australia
- Coordinates: 37°34′03″S 143°55′12″E
- Status: Operational
- Commission date: 23 October 2018
- Owner: AusNet Services
- Operator: EnergyAustralia

Power generation
- Nameplate capacity: 30 MW
- Storage capacity: 30 MW h

Ballarat Energy Storage System (BESS) is a grid-connected energy storage system connected to the Ballarat Area Terminal Substation in Warrenheip, on the eastern outskirts of Ballarat in Victoria. It was commissioned in 2018 and provides 30 MWh of storage capacity at 30 MW. The battery was developed by NuvoGroup (owned by Spotless). Fluence provided the batteries, AusNet Services owns the facility, which is operated by EnergyAustralia. Funding was provided by AusNet Services and Australian Renewable Energy Agency (ARENA).

The system consists of nine units each of which contains Lithium-ion batteries along with cooling and safety systems.
