= McArthur Forest Fire Danger Index =

Australian fire danger index

The McArthur Forest Fire Danger Index (FFDI) is a now defunct Australian fire danger rating system. It was replaced by the Australian Fire Danger Rating System (AFDRS) in 2022.

== History ==
The McArthur Forest Fire Danger Index (FFDI) was developed in the 1950s and 1960s by CSIRO scientist A. G. McArthur to measure the degree of danger of fire in Australian forests. The index combines a record of dryness, based on rainfall and evaporation, with meteorological variables for wind speed, temperature and humidity.

A similar approach was adopted by McArthur for grassland areas. Luke and McArthur details the early development and use of these indices. In 1980 Noble et al. produced algorithms based on mathematical equations of best fit. These algorithms were used from the early 1980s to enable easy computation. However they were often used with input values outside McArthur's intended design, resulting in FFDI values in excess of 100. The power function nature of the algorithm, together with limits of precision in measuring the input variables, may result in a large range of uncertainty in the calculated FFDI. For example, in conditions that produce an FFDI of 100, small fluctuations in wind speed and temperature would suggest a ± 20% range in FFDI.

McArthur tested his meter using low-intensity fires on Black Mountain, near Canberra (see Luke and McArthur) with the most extreme conditions being when FFDI was in the 20s range. McArthur specified a wind averaging period of "more than 5 minutes".

== Levels ==
Fire danger rating
Category	Fire Danger Index	
Category	Forest	Grassland
Catastrophic (Code Red)	100 +	150 +
Extreme	75–99	100–149
Severe	50–74	50–99
Very High	25–49	25–49
High	12–24	12–24
Low–Moderate	0–11	0–11

A fire danger index of between 12 and 25 on the index was generally considered a "high" degree of danger, while a day having a danger index of over 50 was considered a "severe" fire danger rating. Above this level in 2010 a distinction was made between forest and grassland fuels. For forest fuels, an FDI over 75 is categorised as "extreme" and over 100 as "catastrophic" (Victoria does not use the term "Catastrophic" but uses other factors on the worst fire days to declare a "Code Red" period).

For grassland fuels, the threshold FDI values for the Extreme and Catastrophic ratings were increased to 100 and 150 respectively. Fire danger ratings are determined by the responsible fire agency in each jurisdiction, based on weather information provided by the Bureau of Meteorology and fuel information. Other considerations besides the Fire Danger Index, such as the likelihood of lightning ignitions and the severity of wind changes may also be considered by the agencies in determining a fire danger rating.

== Examples and revision ==
McArthur used the conditions of the Black Friday fires of 1939 as his example of a 100 index. The FFDI on Black Saturday, 7 February 2009, reached much higher than the maximum value of 100. At such extremes it is meaningless to specify a particular value of FFDI. After the Black Saturday bushfires, the McArthur Forest Fire Danger Index was revised. The category "Catastrophic" was added to help identify those situations where fires will spread so quickly that they present a critical threat to life and safety.

== Australian Fire Danger Rating System (2022) ==
The Australian Fire Danger Rating System (AFDRS) replaced the McArthur system in 2022.
