= AusNet =

Australian energy company

- Type: Private
- Industry: Energy
- Predecessor: State Electricity Commission of Victoria
- Headquarters: Melbourne, Australia
- Area served: Victoria
- Key people: David Smales, Chief Executive Officer
- Products: Electricity transmission and distribution; gas distribution
- Parent: Brookfield Asset Management
- Website: Official website

AusNet (previously SP AusNet) is an Australian energy delivery services business, owning and operating more than $13 billion of electricity and gas network assets. Formerly listed on the Australian Securities Exchange (ASX) and the Singapore Exchange (SGX), it is a subsidiary of Brookfield Asset Management

== History ==
In 2004 Singapore Power paid US$3.7 billion for TXU's Australian energy portfolio, and in 2005 resold power generation and retailing assets in the TXU portfolio to Hong Kong–based CLP Group for about $2.2 billion. Later in 2005, it publicly floated the business as SP AusNet, and selling 49% of the remaining assets for about $1 billion to the public, while retaining a 51% stake. In 2007, it joined with Babcock & Brown for the $7.4 billion Alinta acquisition, and during the Great Recession that year, it tried but failed to sell the Alinta assets into SP AusNet.

In May 2013, Singapore Power sold 19.9% of its 51% stake in the company to State Grid Corporation of China for A$824 million, valuing the company at A$4.1 billion.

SP AusNet changed its name to AusNet in August 2014, following the end of a management services agreement between Singapore Power and SP AusNet in March.

In February 2022, AusNet was taken private after a successful 2021 bid from Brookfield Asset Management with a number of Australian and Canadian pension funds as co-investors.

== Operations ==
AusNet operates three energy networks in Victoria, Australia:

- high voltage and extra high voltage electric transmission network in Victoria (66 kV and above)
- low voltage and medium voltage electric distribution network in Victoria (22 kV and below) (one of five electricity distributors in Victoria, covering eastern Victoria and eastern/northeastern suburbs of Melbourne)
- gas distribution network in Victoria (one of three gas distributors in Victoria).

AusNet is the manager and operator of the high voltage electricity transmission network in Victoria, and is the sole transmission network service provider (TNSP) in Victoria in the National Electricity Market (NEM). It is a party in the Australian Energy Regulator's (AER) revenue proposal process, where submissions of TNSPs, the AER and other interested parties are used to set the maximum allowable revenue (MAR) for TNSPs for a five-year period.

Its commercial business Mondo provides a range of services and solutions to enable community energy hubs and solar mini grids.

== Legal issues ==
The 2009 Victorian Bushfires Royal Commission found that the Kilmore East part of the February 2009 Black Saturday bushfires in Victoria "started after the conductor between poles 38 and 39 failed and the live conductor came into contact with a cable stay supporting pole 38. This contact caused arcing that ignited vegetation near the base of pole 38." Following a class action lawsuit related to that fire, in July 2014 the company announced a A$260 million legal settlement. Utility Service Providers will pay another $10 million, and the Government of Victoria a further $29 million.

In December 2014 a AU$378.6 million sum was approved by the Supreme Court of Victoria as AusNet's part of a $494 million settlement of a second class action. Utility Services Corporation Ltd will also pay $12.5 million, and the Victorian Government $103.6 million. It has been noted as being "the biggest class action settlement in Australian legal history". The previous highest payout was $200 Million in Kirby v Centro Properties Limited (No 6) [2012] FCA 650 (19 June 2012).
