= John Dixon (judge) =

Australian judge

John Dixon is a former judge at the Supreme Court of Victoria, who had a legal career spanning 50 years.

== Early life and education ==
John Dixon is a graduate of the law school at the University of Queensland and completed his Master of Laws at University of Melbourne.

== Career ==
=== Lawyer ===
From 1977 Dixon practised as a lawyer, spending 27 years of his practice in criminal and commercial law. As a barrister, he worked in many jurisdictions in commercial law. He specialised in investment law and professional negligence. He also practised as a mediator and was a certified arbitrator.

=== Judge ===
He was appointed to the Supreme Court of Victoria in the Trials Division on 14 September 2014.

During his tenure as judge, he presided over some complex class actions, including by victims of the Black Saturday bushfires in 2009, another which challenged legal fees charged by lawyers, and the Rebel Wilson defamation case against Bauer Media in 2018.

== Other roles ==
Dixon was a Fellow of the Australian Institute for Commercial Arbitration. He also occupied positions on a number of bodies, including:

- Treasurer and executive member of the Commercial Bar Association (Commbar)
- Chairman of the Corporations and Securities Law Section of CommBar
- Vice-President of the Australian Institute for Commercial Arbitration
- Member of the Pro Bono Committee of the Victorian Bar Council

== Retirement ==
Dixon retired in September 2023. In his farewell ceremony, which was live-streamed on 27 September, Dixon called for the recognition of Indigenous Australians in the Constitution, ahead of the 2023 Australian Indigenous Voice referendum.
