= Mount Despair (Victoria) =

Mountain in Victoria, Australia

- Location within Victoria

Highest point
- Elevation: 1,383–1,461 m (4,537–4,793 ft) AHD
- Coordinates: 37°06′59″S 146°40′29″E

Geography
- Location: Victoria, Australia
- Parent range: Great Dividing Range

Mount Despair is a mountain, part of the Cobbler Plateau, in the Alpine Shire within the Alpine National Park in the alpine region of Victoria, Australia.

The summit of Mount Despair rises in the range of 1,383–1,461 metres (4,537–4,793 ft) above sea level.

== See also ==
- List of mountains in Australia § Victoria
