= Kilmore East =

- Town
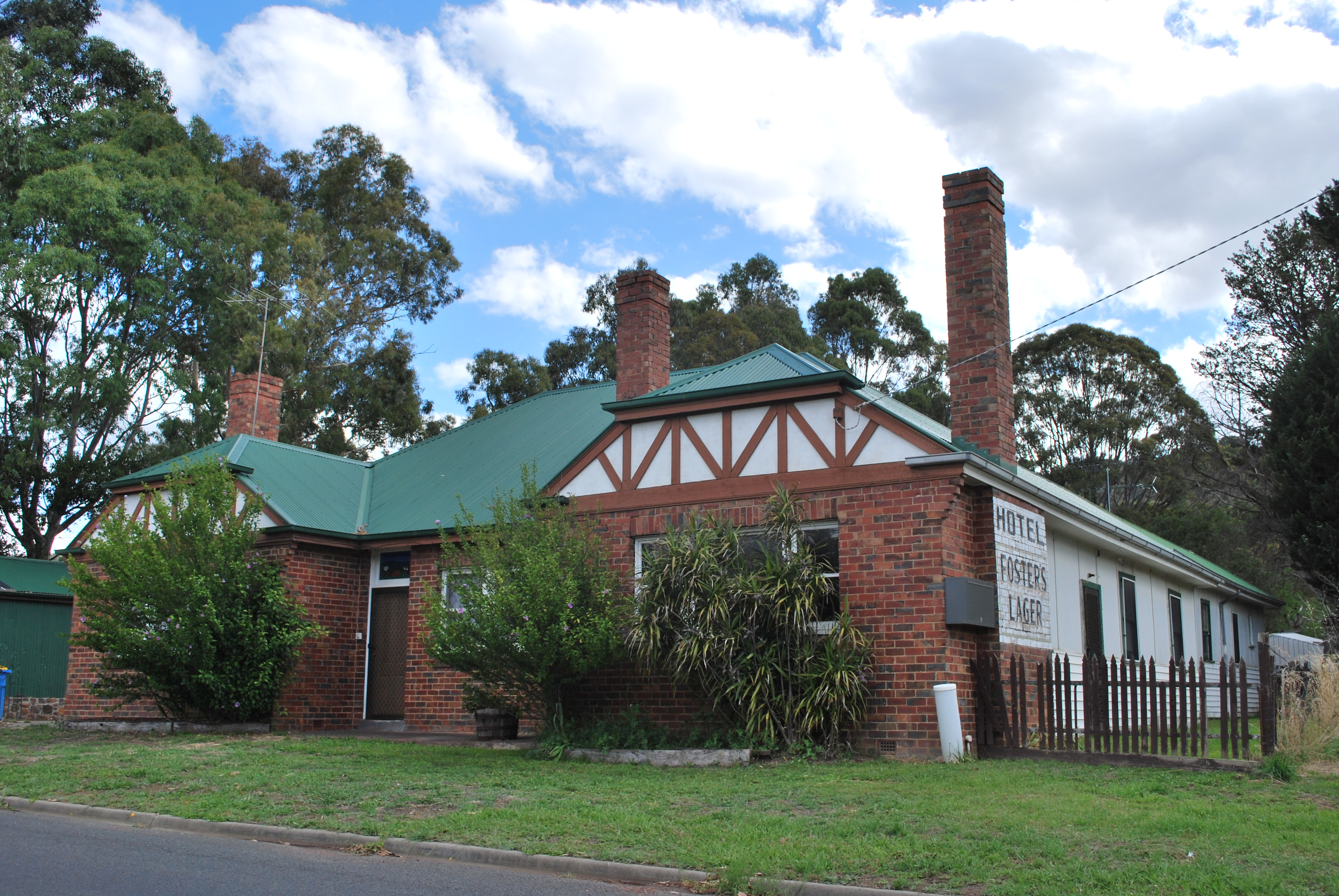
- The former Kilmore East Hotel, opposite the train station

- Coordinates: 37°18′S 144°59′E
- Country: Australia
- State: Victoria
- Region: Hume
- LGA: Shire of Mitchell
- Location: 65 km (40 mi) from Melbourne; 4 km (2.5 mi) from Kilmore

Government
  - State electorate: Euroa
  - Federal division: Nicholls

Population
  - Total: 417 (2016 census)
- Postcode: 3764
Localities around Kilmore East
Moranding	Broadford	Sunday Creek
Kilmore	Kilmore East	Clonbinane
Kilmore	Kilmore	Clonbinane

Kilmore East is a locality in the Australian state of Victoria, 65 kilometres north of Melbourne. At the 2016 census, Kilmore East had a population of 417.

Kilmore East was settled by John Green, a neighboring pastoralist on the Kilmore Plains. He was a squatter, and William Rutledge purchased the best area occupied by Green in 1841. Green's head station was built 400 metres SSE of what became the Kilmore East Railway Station.

Kilmore East railway and telegraph station was established in 1872 to serve Kilmore.

The Post Office at Kilmore East opened on 1 September 1872 as Gavan Duffy, named after Sir Charles Gavan Duffy the Premier of Victoria until June of that year. It was renamed Kilmore East two months later and closed in 1976. Gavan Street and Duffy Street are reminders of the original township name.

In 1976, a bluestone quarry was developed 3 km to the north of the station.

A hilltop above Saunders Road was identified as the starting point of a major bushfire on 7 February 2009 that devastated many localities to the south-east including Wandong and Kinglake. An investigation put some of the blame on a recloser that tried to restore power to a "dangling" power line.

== See also ==
- Black Saturday bushfires
- Recloser
