= Health in the Democratic Republic of the Congo =

Democratic Republic of the Congo (orthographic projection)

Health problems have been a long-standing issue limiting development in the Democratic Republic of the Congo (DR Congo).

In 2022, the Human Rights Measurement Initiative found that the DRC was fulfilling 73.1% of what it should be fulfilling for the right to health, based on its level of income. For children's health, the DRC achieved 96.6% of what is expected based on its income. For adult health, the DRC achieves 100.0% of what is expected based on national income. The DRC falls into the "very bad" category when evaluating the right to reproductive health, fulfilling 22.8% of what the nation is expected to achieve, based on the income it has available.

== Health infrastructure ==
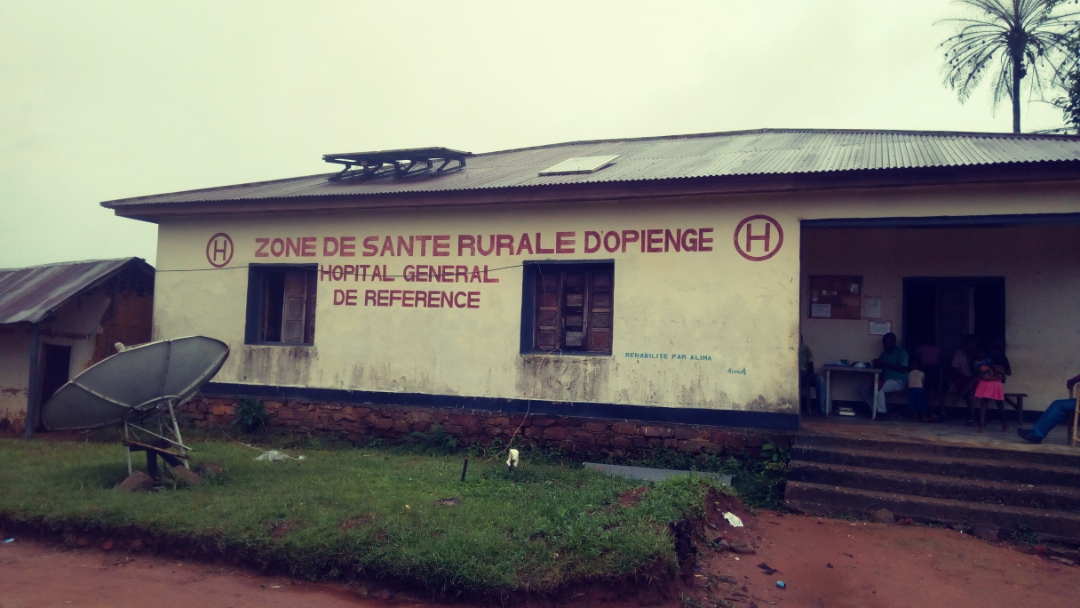
Sole hospital in Opienge (Tshopo)

Medical facilities are severely limited, medical materials are in short supply. An adequate supply of prescription or over-the-counter drugs in local stores or pharmacies is generally not available. Payment for any medical services is expected in cash in the DR Congo, in advance of treatment.

== Health status ==
=== Life expectancy ===
Life expectancy at birth in the DRC, 1950 to 2021

In 2018, life expectancy in the DR Congo was 60.3 years: 59 for the male population and 61.6 for females.

=== Malaria ===
Malaria is a major health problem in the DR Congo. Malaria is the principal cause of morbidity and mortality, accounting for more than 40 percent of all outpatient visits and for 19 percent of deaths among children under five years of age. Given that the majority of the population lives in high transmission zones, it has been estimated that the DRC accounts for 11 percent of all cases of malaria in sub-Saharan Africa.

The National Malaria Control Strategic Plan 2016–2020 (NSP) introduced the stratification of provinces based on parasite prevalence as measured by the 2013 Demographic and Health Survey (DHS). This approach allows the NSP to focus high-impact interventions in the areas that bear the greatest disease burden. In line with this strategy, international donors are concentrating their efforts in 9 out of 26 provinces, Kasai Oriental, Haut Katanga, Haut Lomami, Tanganyika, Lualaba, Sankuru, Lomami, Kasai Central, and Sud Kivu.

According to the 2013 DHS, progress is being made in key malaria interventions, such as insecticide-treated net ownership and use. Mortality rates for children under five years of age fell by 34 percent and the incidence rate fell by 40 percent between 2010 and 2018.

Malaria remains a major public health challenge in the Democratic Republic of the Congo. In early 2025, an outbreak in Equateur province led to 943 infections and 52 deaths. Initially suspected to be food poisoning, lab tests confirmed malaria as the cause in March. A similar outbreak in December 2024 was later identified as malaria.

=== HIV/AIDS ===
HIV/Aids is the most serious health problem in the DR Congo due to the incurable nature of the disease. By the end of 2003, UNAIDS estimated that 1.1 million people were living with HIV/AIDS, for an overall adult HIV prevalence of 4.2%. In the 1990s, life expectancy in the DR Congo dropped 9% as a result of HIV/AIDS. According to UNAIDS, several factors fuel the spread of HIV in the DR Congo, including the movement of large numbers of refugees and soldiers, scarcity and high cost of safe blood transfusions in rural areas, a lack of counseling, few HIV testing sites, high levels of untreated sexually transmitted infections among sex workers and their clients, and low availability of condoms outside Kinshasa and one or two provincial capitals.

With an eventual end of hostilities and a government in transition, population movements associated with increased stability and economic revitalization will exacerbate the spread of HIV, which is now localized in areas most directly affected by the presence of troops and war-displaced populations. Consecutive wars have made it nearly impossible to conduct effective and sustainable HIV/AIDS prevention activities.

=== Cholera ===
Although incidence and mortality from cholera can be difficult to estimate, particularly given the DRC's lack of resources and inadequate surveillance systems, several studies demonstrate that the DRC experiences a significant burden of disease. In 2015, 19,705 cases of cholera were reported in the DRC. Few cases are laboratory-confirmed, so the incidence of cholera can be under-estimated.

The highest annual attack rates occurred in 2011 in the Eastern provinces of the Democratic Republic of the Congo that border the Great Lakes. These provinces are Orientale, North and South Kivu, Katanga and Kasai Oriental. North and South Kivu and Katanga had the highest attack rate, with over 10 cases per 100,000 people, every year between 2000 and 2011. The high annual attack rates occurred in the Eastern provinces because there is an environmental reservoir for V. cholerae in the lakes of the rift valley.

There are seasonal peaks that usually occur during the first quarter of the year which also increases the attack rate. Fishermen travel from the eastern lakes in the Democratic Republic of the Congo to larger cities at the end of the dry season which gives way to seasonal variations in incidence of Cholera. Cross-border cholera remains difficult to track due to the lack of collaboration and communication between the Sub-Saharan countries.

=== Disease outbreaks ===
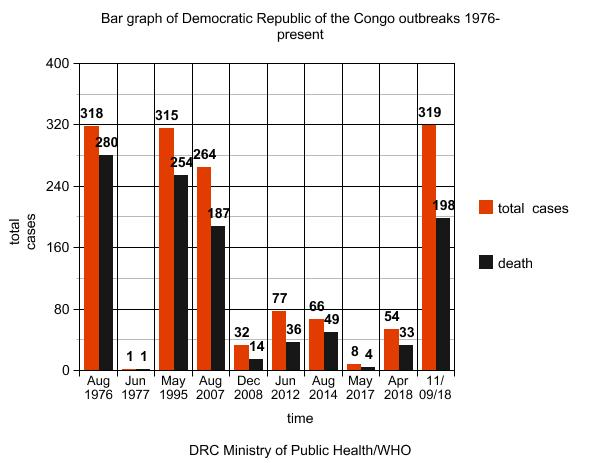
Ebola outbreaks in the DRC, 1976 to 2018

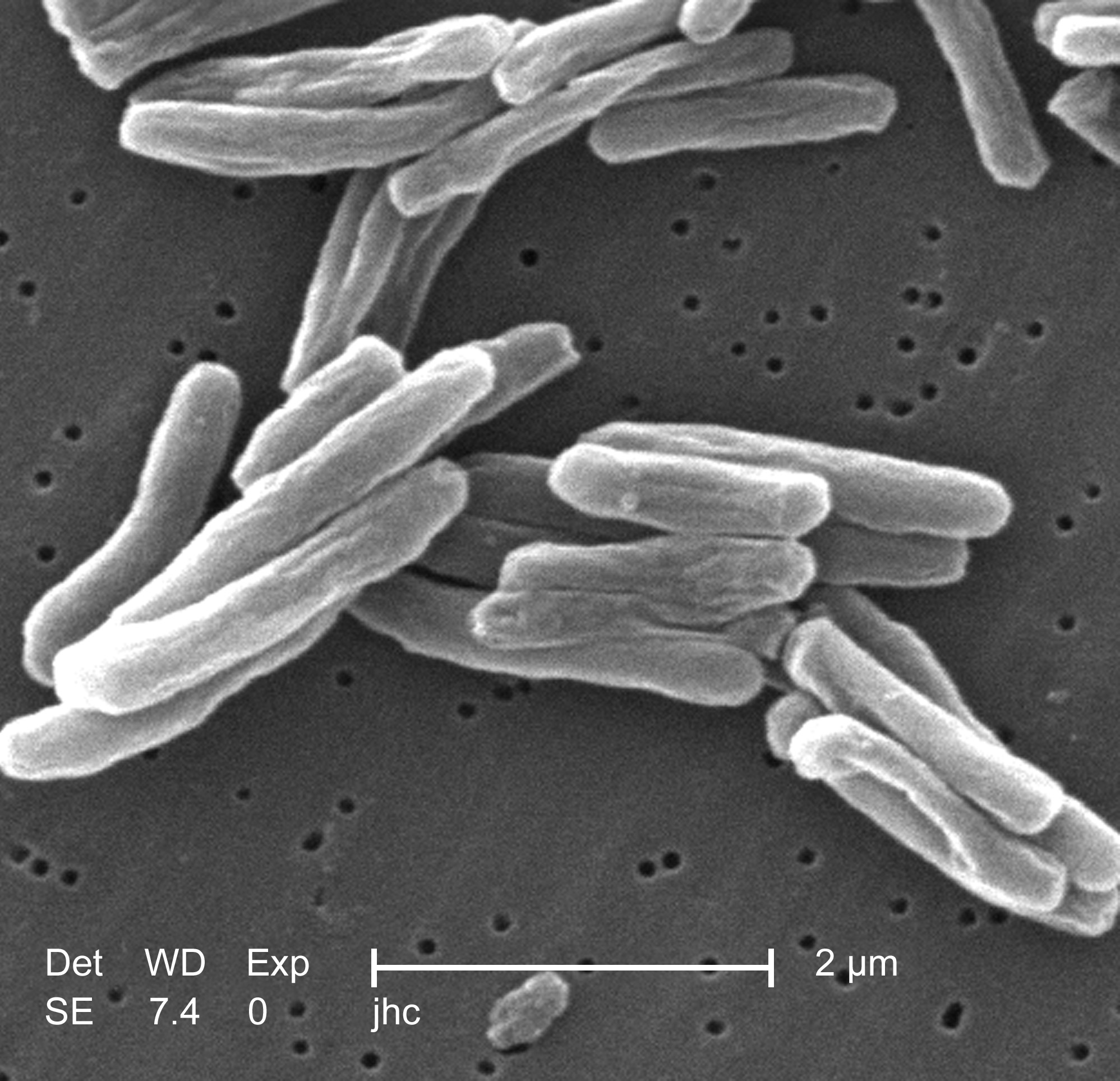
Mycobacterium tuberculosis

There have been at least 16 outbreaks of Ebola virus disease in the Democratic Republic of the Congo. The DRC faces recurrent cases of other infectious diseases, including hemorrhagic fevers, polio, cholera, and typhoid. Tuberculosis remains an increasingly serious public health concern.

In the Kasai province, health authorities declared an ebola disease outbreak with 28 suspected cases as of September 4, 2025

In 2019 a measles outbreak claimed more deaths than Ebola.

=== River blindness ===
People are at risk of onchocerciasis (River blindness) in parts of the DR Congo.

=== Maternal and child healthcare ===
The 2010 maternal mortality rate per 100,000 births for Democratic Republic of the Congo was 670. It was 533.6 in 2008 and 550 in 1990. The under 5 mortality rate, per 1,000 births is 199. The neonatal mortality as a percentage of under 5's mortality is 26. In 2018, the number of midwives per 1,000 live births was 2. The lifetime risk of death for pregnant women 1 in 24.

==== Nutrition ====
The DRC nutritional situation is still alarming despite global health progress. In 2014, 69% of its population suffered from undernutrition. The prevalence of stunting was 43% among children under 5 years old, and 14% of women in childbearing age. Among children under 5 years old, 8% had wasting, 3% had Severe Acute Malnutrition, and 23% were underweight.

Undernutrition has significant long-term impact on the cognitive development of children, particularly those under 5 years old and of women in childbearing age previously malnourished. This affects human capital and the DRC's economic productivity. Undernutrition common indicators recommended by WHO include anthropometric measurements, biochemical indicators and clinical signs of undernutrition. Micronutrient deficiencies in the DRC are caused mostly by food deprivation and poverty. In 2014, there was a particularly high incidence of vitamin A deficiency, at 61% of the population. Iron deficiency impacted 47% of children under 5 years old, 38% of women of reproductive age and 23% of men.

Improving the nutritional status of the population, particularly for children under 5 and women of childbearing age, would reduce the mortality rate in this age group and make progress on Health Outcome Indicators, especially the achievement of objective 3 of sustainable development, which aims to ensure a healthy life and promote the well-being of all at all ages. It would improve human capital, economic productivity and development.

== See also ==
- Ministry of Health (Democratic Republic of the Congo)
- Graham Toulmin AM and Wendy Toulmin AM, dental clinic philanthropists
