= 2009 Australia Day Honours =

The 2009 Australia Day Honours are appointments to various orders and honours to recognise and reward good works by Australian citizens. The list was announced on 26 January 2009 by the Governor General of Australia, Quentin Bryce.

The Australia Day Honours are the first of the two major annual honours lists, the first announced to coincide with Australia Day (26 January), with the other being the Queen's Birthday Honours, which are announced on the second Monday in June.

† indicates an award given posthumously.

== Order of Australia ==
=== Companion (AC) ===
==== General Division ====
Recipient	Citation	Notes
Lessing Faith Bandler AM	For distinguished service to the community through the advancement of human rights and social justice, and by raising public awareness and understanding of the cultural heritage of South Seas Islanders, and to women's issues.	
The Honourable Kim Christian Beazley AM	For service to the Parliament of Australia through contributions to the development of government policies in relation to defence and international relations, as an advocate for Indigenous people, and to the community.	
Marilyn Ann Darling	For service to the development, advancement and growth of visual arts in Australia and internationally, particularly through the National Portrait Gallery, and to the community through a range of philanthropic endeavours.	

=== Officer (AO) ===
==== General Division ====
Recipient	Citation	Notes
Cheryl Sarah Bart	For service to the economic and cultural development of South Australia through leadership and executive roles, to the community through social welfare organisations, and to sport.	
Professor Lynda Dent Beazley	For service to medical science, particularly in the field of brain-related research both nationally and internationally, and as a contributor to the development of science policy in Western Australia.	
John Anthony Bell AM OBE	For service to the performing arts, nationally and internationally, as an actor and a director, as a supporter of emerging artists, and through a range of educational programs.	
Julian W K Burnside QC	For service as a human rights advocate, particularly for refugees and asylum seekers, to the arts as a patron and fundraiser, and to the law.	
Emeritus Professor Graeme Wilber Clarke	For service to tertiary education as a leader and academic in the field of classical studies, and through executive and advisory roles with professional bodies.	
The Honourable Gregory John Crafter	For service to the Parliament of South Australia, to education policy in the areas of curriculum development and improved opportunities for teachers, and to the community through social welfare and youth organisations.	
Professor Brian Michael Crommelin	For service to the law and to legal education, particularly as a tertiary educator and through the development of mining and petroleum law in Australia.	
Doctor Ronald Bertram Cullen	For service to public administration in Victoria through the development of innovative management practices and organisational change.	
(Frà) Professor Richard Sydney Divall OBE	For service to the performing arts as a conductor, composer and musicologist, through the preservation of Australia's musical heritage and support for young performers, and to the community.	
John Brehmer Fairfax AM	For service to the print media industry, particularly the development of news services in rural and remote areas, and to the community through executive roles with agricultural, youth and charitable organisations.	
Doctor James Ian Gill	For service to water resource management and administration in Western Australia, to the transport industry, and to education.	
His Honour Kevin James Hammond	For service to the law, particularly in relation to criminal trial procedures and corruption investigation through judicial roles, review and administration.	
Professor David John Hill AM	For service to public health, particularly through leadership roles in the promotion of cancer awareness and prevention programs.	
David John Klingberg AM	For service to the tertiary education sector as a contributor to governance policy, and to commercial and economic development and infrastructure projects.	
Professor Pauline Yvonne Ladiges	For service to the advancement of botanical science and research, particularly in the field of taxonomy and plant systematics, and to the conservation of Australian flora and fauna.	
John Victor McCarthy	For service to the property and construction industries, particularly through leadership roles in peak bodies, and through promotion of co-operation, research and innovation.	
Doctor Brian Anthony McNamee	For service to business and commerce through innovative leadership in the expansion and growth of the Australian bioscience industry, and to the community.	
Doctor David Raymond Morgan	For service to the finance sector as a leader in the development of policies affecting the regulation of financial institutions, corporate social responsibility, and economic reform.	
The Honourable Ronald Sackville QC	For service to the administration of the Australian judicial system, to the reform of federal and state law, and to legal education.	
Laureate Professor Robert William Sanson-Fisher	For service to improving public health outcomes through research and education in the areas of behavioural science, cancer control and Indigenous health.	
Jane Louise Schwager	For service to social welfare through leadership roles with a range of organisations and the development of professional programs and standards.	
Professor Colin Edward Sullivan	For service to medicine as an innovator in the field of sleep disorders and the development of equipment and treatment practices.	
The Honourable Bernard George Teague	For service to the law, particularly through leadership roles with the Law Institute of Victoria, the Parole Board of Victoria and Forensicare, to the judiciary through the development of innovative courtroom practices, and to the community.	

==== Military Division ====
Branch	Recipient	Citation	Notes
Navy	Rear Admiral Davyd Rhys Thomas AM CSC RAN	For distinguished service as Commodore Flotillas, Maritime Commander Australia, Commander Australian Fleet and Commander, Australian Defence College.	
Army	Major General Ian Bruce Flawith CSC	For distinguished service to the Australian Army in the fields of training and personnel, particularly as Commander 11th Brigade, Assistant Commander of the 1st Division and as Commander of the 2nd Division.	
Army	Major General Richard Gary Wilson AM	For distinguished service to the Australian Army in the fields of force structure, personnel training and operations, particularly as Commander Training Command – Army and as the Commander of the 1st Division.	

=== Member (AM) ===
==== General Division ====
Recipient	Citation	Notes
The Reverend Stuart Noel Abrahams	For service to international humanitarian aid through the establishment and administration of the Hamlin Fistula Relief and Aid Fund, and to the Anglican Church of Australia.	
Wilton Everett Ainsworth	For service to the community of Newcastle and the Hunter region through a range of infrastructure, business, educational and tourism organisations.	
Susan Mary Aldenhoven	For service to dental hygiene as a clinician and educator and through executive roles with professional organisations at state, national and international levels.	
Geoffrey David Allen	For service to business, particularly in the area of corporate public affairs, through a range of executive roles with professional organisations, and to the community.	
Geoffrey John Atherden	For service to the television industry as a scriptwriter, and to the advancement of writers for performance through executive roles with professional organisations.	
Wayne Bartholomew	For service to surfing as a competitor, administrator and mentor, and to the environment through support for a range of coastal conservation groups.	
Emeritus Professor Hedley Beare	For service to education at secondary and tertiary levels as an academic and administrator, to policy development, and to a range of professional associations.	
Associate Professor Robert J S (Bob) Beeton	For service to the environmental sciences as a researcher and educator and through a range of professional and natural resource management organisations.	
Luca Belgiorno-Nettis	For service to the arts and to the community through a range of philanthropic endeavours and executive roles.	
James Raymond Bourke MG	For service to veterans and their families through the establishment and implementation of ‘Operation Aussies Home’.	
John Gillis Broinowski	For service to the community, particularly through the Foundation for National Parks and Wildlife, and to business.	
Doctor Robert Alexander (Alex) Buchanan	For service to food science and technology, particularly through research supporting aid programs in the South East Asia region, and to the community.	
Doctor Ian George Cameron	For service to civil engineering, particularly in the area of bridge construction, to dispute resolution, and to professional and community associations.	
Ian Leslie Carter	For service to the community, particularly through Anglicare WA and through executive roles in a range of social justice and community organisations.	
Bill Gabriel Casimaty	For service to the horticultural industry through the development and implementation of innovative turf construction and management practices and through the development of irrigation schemes, to viticulture, and to the community.	
Geoffrey Ross Cattach	For service to the community, particularly through the Children's Leukaemia and Cancer Research Foundation, and to agricultural, health, sporting and historical organisations in the Shire of Harvey.	
Professor Jocelyn Valerie Chey	For service to education, particularly in the field of Chinese studies and to fostering the development and promotion of academic and cultural links between Australia and China.	
The Honourable Richard Colin Chisholm	For service to the judiciary, to the law and to legal education, particularly in the field of family law and the welfare and rights of children and young people.	
Professor Narendranath Jayantha (Naren) Chitty	For service to education, particularly in the field of international communications as a researcher and academic, and to a range of professional associations.	
John Patrick Condon	For service to the dairy farming industry, particularly through the implementation of herd improvement initiatives and to a range of industry organisations, and to the community.	
Peter Francis Conran	For service to the executive arm of government, particularly through advisory roles and to strategic policy development and implementation, and to intergovernmental relations at both state and federal levels.	
Garry Leslie Coombes	For service to the community through St John Ambulance Australia, and to the technical and further education sector in South Australia.	
Peter James Corish	For service to agriculture, particularly the cotton industry, through the implementation of innovative farming practices, the development of agricultural and natural resources policies and through a range of industry and related organisations.	
Peter Corones	For service to the community of the Gladstone region through a range of local government, transport infrastructure, education, water, economic and industrial development and promotional organisations.	
Doctor David Charles Cousins	For service to the community through a range of executive roles contributing to the administration and development of consumer policy and legislation.	
Deborah (Debby) Cox	For service to the international community, particularly the conservation, protection, research and care of primates through the Jane Goodall Institute in Uganda and as a contributor to the establishment of the Pan African Sanctuary Alliance.	
The Honourable Justice Keiran Anthony Cullinane	For service to the judiciary and to the law, to the James Cook University, and to the community of north Queensland.	
Norman Francis Dalton	For service to engineering, particularly through contributions to the development, construction and commissioning of power stations in Victoria, and to the community, particularly through the Lord Somers Camp and Power House.	
Carmel Tyrrell Daveson	For service to the Mackay region through a range of social welfare, education and arts organisations.	
Sandra J de Wolf-Gurner	For service to child and family welfare, particularly as a contributor to policy development and service delivery issues affecting families and through Berry Street Victoria.	
†Edmund Francis (Tim) Denny DFC and Bar	For service to the essential oil industry, particularly through the development and application of steam distillation technology, and to tourism in Tasmania.	
Fiona Naomi Dixon-Thompson	For service to the international community through the establishment and coordination of the Orphans and Vulnerable Children project in Mwandi, Zambia and support for children affected by HIV/AIDS.	
Alan Russell Dodge	For service to arts organisations through management, administrative and advisory roles, through the continuing development of the Art Gallery of Western Australia, and to the community.	
The Most Reverend Doctor Adrian Leo Doyle	For service to the Catholic Church in Australia and to the community, particularly as Archbishop of Hobart and through Caritas programs supporting international aid to developing countries.	
Richard Dumbrell	For service to the development of the Australian oil and gas exploration and drilling industries and to the petroleum engineering profession.	
The Reverend Doctor William Howell Edwards	For service to the Indigenous community as an interpreter and through the recording of the languages and culture of the Anangu people of central Australia, to education, and to the Uniting Church in Australia.	
Elizabeth Ellis	For service to netball and the encouragement of women in sport, and to the community through support for a range of charitable organisations.	
Doctor Elizabeth Anne Farrell	For service to medicine in the field of women's health, particularly obstetrics and gynaecology through research, clinical practice, education and administrative roles and as a contributor to a range of professional organisations.	
Malcolm Dascar Garvin	For service to the community through the establishment of Fusion Australia and the development of social welfare programs that support and guide young people, and as a broadcaster and author.	
Roger John Gent	For service to medical science in the field of paediatric sonography as a practitioner, educator and researcher, and through the advancement of techniques and facilities aiding the investigation of children's disorders.	
Diane Jennifer Grady	For service to business, particularly in the areas of corporate governance and change management with a range of private sector organisations, and as an advocate for the advancement of women in business.	
Edward Douglas Graham	For service to the community through leadership roles in the successful search for HMAS Sydney.	
Doctor Anthony Knight Gregson	For service to agricultural science, particularly in the areas of agri-biotechnology and grain growing, to national and international research and development organisations through a range of executive roles, and to education.	
John Arno Halbert MBE	For service to Australian Rules football administration, to youth development, and to the community, particularly through the Lutheran Church of Australia.	
Ronald Ernest Hancock	For service to the finance sector, particularly through the development of the building society industry in Queensland, and to the community of Bundaberg.	
Clinical Professor Phillip John Harris	For service to medicine in the field of cardiology as a clinician, administrator and educator, through contributions to professional organisations, and to the community.	
David Ernest Hartley	For service to medical science and to the community through the design and development of minimally invasive surgical technology, particularly the intra-aortic stent.	
Brian Weir Henderson	For service as a pioneer in the television news and entertainment sectors, and as a mentor to aspiring and established presenters, readers and journalists.	
Doctor Patrick Joseph Henry	For service to dentistry as a clinician, researcher and educator contributing to the advancement of implant dental techniques.	
Marcia Elaine Hines	For service to the entertainment industry as a performer, judge and mentor, and to the community through a range of charitable organisations.	
Timothy James (Tim) Horan	For service to Rugby Union football, particularly as an international representative player, and to the community through promoting awareness of spinal injury prevention and support for youth mentoring organisations.	
William James Horman APM	For service to the community through a range of executive roles with crime and injury prevention and anti-violence organisations and raising awareness of responsible gambling.	
Professor Graham Leighton Hutchinson	For service to civil engineering, particularly in relation to the structural consequences of earthquakes through research, educational and advisory roles and contributions to professional organisations.	
Cynthia Jackson	For service to the arts as a benefactor and supporter of the Museum of Contemporary Art and through programs that encourage young artists.	
†Doctor Edward Ashley Jackson	For service to the arts as a benefactor and supporter of the Museum of Contemporary Art and through programs that encourage young artists.	
Doctor Michael Robert Jones PSM	For service to medicine in the areas of health services management, accreditation and patient care, particularly with the Australian Council on Healthcare Standards and the World Health Organisation.	
Didi Ananda Kalika	For service to the welfare of children in Mongolia as the founder and director of the Lotus Children's Centre and through programs to improve child health and educational development.	
Professor Warren Merton Kerr	For service to architecture through leadership roles in a range of professional organisations and contributions to the planning and design of major health facilities.	
William Frederick Killinger	For service to railway engineering through the construction and development of passenger and freight transport systems in Australia and internationally, to professional organisations, to the mining sector, and to the community.	
Sharolyn Margaret Kimmorley	For service to the performing arts as an operatic accompanist, through the tuition and mentoring of young and emerging artists, and to the community.	
Annemaree Lanteri	For service to the law, particularly within the family law jurisdiction, to continuing legal education and to professional organisations.	
Marion Rose Lê OAM	For service to the community as a human rights advocate, cultural and migration adviser and contributor to the development of refugee programs in the Australian Capital Territory.	
Cedric John Lee	For service to the community as a foster parent providing care for short-term pre-adoptive placements and crisis care for babies and children.	
Deborah Yvonne Lee	For service to the community as a foster parent providing care for short-term pre-adoptive placements and crisis care for babies and children.	
Associate Professor Stephen Lee	For service to medicine in the field of dermatology as a clinician, mentor and educator and through roles with professional organisations.	
Clinical Associate Professor Brian Charles McCaughan	For service to medicine in the field of cardiothoracic surgery as a clinician, researcher and educator and through contributions to the delivery of health care services.	
Jennifer Sue McConnell	For service to physiotherapy as a practitioner and researcher, particularly through the development of innovative musculoskeletal pain management techniques and treatment.	
Doctor Neil Anderson McEwan	For service to music and to the community as an educator, researcher, musicologist and choral conductor and as Director of Music at Christ Church St Laurence in Sydney.	
Lesley Lorrelle McFarlane	For service to education, particularly as an advocate for improved learning opportunities for women and girls, through curriculum development and professional organisations.	
The Honourable Tony McGrady	For service to the Parliament of Queensland, to the community of Mount Isa through local government roles, and to youth training and development programs.	
George Millar McLaughlin	For service to the information technology sector through a range of advisory roles with national and international educational, research and infrastructure organisations, particularly Australia's Academic and Research Network.	
Ian James McLean CSC	For service to music as an administrator, director, conductor and musician, particularly through the Canberra Symphony Orchestra, to the promotion and development of the arts, and to the community.	
Doctor Toby Leitch McLeay	For service to medicine in rural and remote areas as a practitioner, trainer and mentor and through contributions to health services and programs in Indigenous communities.	
John Bernard McLenaghan	For service to the finance and banking industries, particularly in the field of international statistics, and to the promotion of Australian-American relations through academic and financial roles.	
Emeritus Professor Alison Gay Mackinnon	For service to education, particularly in the fields of social research and development, as an academic and author, and to the community through roles with history organisations.	
Doctor Michael Douglas Mann	For service to international relations through the development and provision of tertiary education opportunities in Vietnam, to educational reform, and as a contributor to philanthropic and humanitarian projects in the East Asia region.	
Walter Rinaldo Mariani	For service to the community through the international promotion of Australia as a tourism destination, and to aviation.	
†Doctor Raymattja Gandjalala Marika	For service to Indigenous communities in rural and remote areas as an educator, linguist and scholar, through the preservation of Indigenous languages and the promotion of reconciliation and cross-cultural understanding.	
Norman Alfred May OAM	For service to the community through promotional and support roles with the Australian Olympic and Commonwealth Games Team Appeals and through cultural and seniors' organisations.	
Doctor Margaret J Mayston	For service to physiotherapy, particularly the treatment of people with cerebral palsy and other neurological conditions using the Bobath method, to research in the area of neuro-rehabilitation, and to education.	
Alastair MacDonald Milroy	For service to national crime investigation and prevention, particularly through the Australian Crime Commission, and to the fostering and development of law enforcement and government inter-agency relations and co-operation.	
Dorothy Lucy Missingham	For service to international humanitarian aid through contributions to refugee resettlement and migrant assistance programs in South East Asia and Australia, and to the community.	
Doctor Lloyd Lewis Morris	For service to medicine in the fields of paediatric and diagnostic radiology as a clinician and educator and through the promotion of improved health services for children.	
Robert Douglas Morton	For service to science education, particularly chemistry through curriculum development, as a teacher and mentor and through contributions to educational and scientific organisations.	
Michael Woolf Naphtali	For service to the community through executive roles with environmental, sporting, educational and Jewish organisations.	
Dawn Marie O'Neil	For service to the community through the development of support services delivered by Lifeline Australia, and to the promotion of reform in the mental health sector.	
†Doctor Philip Henry Opas OBE QC	For service to the law through state and federal government review boards and tribunals, as a practitioner, and to the community through a range of charitable, historical and sporting organisations.	
Professor Patrick Newport Parkinson	For service to the law and to legal education, particularly in the areas of family and child protection law, as an author, through contributions to policy reform, and to the community.	
Marion Isabel Peters	For service to palliative care nursing through the adoption and promotion of advancements in pain and symptom management, through professional associations, and to the community.	
The Honourable John Charles Price	For service to the Parliament of New South Wales, and to the community through executive roles with youth, educational, church and broadcasting organisations.	
Janine Norton Prior	For service to the community through the child sponsorship programs of Baptist World Aid Australia.	
Patricia Marie Ritchie	For service to the community through philanthropic contributions to, and support for, medical research, Indigenous education and charitable organisations.	
Llewellyn Charles Russell	For service to the shipping and transport logistics industries, to the development and promotion of trade opportunities, and to professional associations.	
Doctor Susan Barbara Rutkowski	For service to medicine in the area of spinal cord rehabilitation as a clinician, mentor and researcher, and through contributions to advocacy groups and charitable organisations.	
Gary William Sansom	For service to primary industry through the development of sustainable agricultural practices and to the promotion of environmental and bio-security management systems within the chicken meat industry.	
David Charles Scarf	For service to the community, particularly through a range of executive and fundraising roles with church and social welfare organisations, and to the Melkite Catholic Eparchy of Australia and New Zealand.	
Professor Julianne Schultz	For service to the community as a journalist, writer, editor and academic, to fostering debate on issues affecting society, and to professional ethics and accountability.	
Ian John Scotney	For service to Rugby Union football, particularly the development of improved professional standards for referees, as a player and coach and through a range of administrative roles.	
Peter John Short	For service to the law as a practitioner, to legal education and the promotion of ethical standards, through contributions to a range of professional organisations, and to the community, particularly people with an intellectual disability.	
June Valerie Smith	For service to the promotion of children's literature, particularly through the Children's Book Council of Australia, and as a supporter of emerging authors and illustrators.	
Mary Alice Squire	For service to conservation and the environment through the protection and propagation of threatened plant species in semi-arid areas and the promotion of land care.	
His Grace the Most Reverend Bishop Peter Edward Stasiuk	For service to religion and to the community as Bishop for the Ukrainian Catholics of Australia, New Zealand and Oceania and through contributions to Catholic welfare, counselling and development programs.	
Brian John Suters	For service as an architect in the areas of design, education and the preservation of architectural heritage, through professional associations, and to the community.	
Professor James Clifford Taylor	For service to tertiary education, particularly in the areas of open learning, on-line and distance education, as an academic, researcher and administrator.	
Doctor Graham Adrian Toulmin	For service to international humanitarian aid, particularly through the provision of dental health services and pastoral care to the people of the Democratic Republic of the Congo, and to the community.	
Wendy Alison Toulmin	For service to international humanitarian aid, particularly through the provision of dental health services and pastoral care to the people of the Democratic Republic of the Congo, and to the community.	
Doctor Caroline Turner	For service to the visual arts through executive roles with the Queensland Art Gallery, to the establishment and fostering of cultural relationships in the Asia-Pacific region, as an academic, and to the community.	
†Gregory Lawrence Urwin PSM	For service to international relations through contributions to the promotion of regional co-operation and development as Secretary-General of the Pacific Islands Forum.	
Doctor Barbara Julienne Wake	For service to international humanitarian aid through contributions to refugee resettlement and migrant assistance programs in South-East Asia and Australia, and to the community.	
Doctor Adrian Charles Walter	For service to the arts, particularly in the area of classical guitar performance and musical composition through the Darwin International Guitar Festival, to music education and as a supporter of emerging performers.	
Professor Erich Weigold	For service to the physical sciences through research, education and leadership roles, as an academic and author and to the development of scientific policy in Australia.	
Professor Harvey Alick Whiteford	For service to medicine as a leader in mental health reform, the development of national standards of clinical care, professional competence and economic policy.	
John Bolton Wood	For service to the performing arts as an operatic baritone, through the tuition and mentoring of emerging young artists, and to the community.	
†Klaus Rudolf Zimmer	For service to the visual arts as a master artisan in the area of stained glass design, to education as a teacher and for assisting the development of the studio glass movement in Australia.	

==== Military Division ====
Branch	Recipient	Citation	Notes
Navy	Commodore Timothy William Barrett	For exceptional service to the Royal Australian Navy as Director Naval Officers’ Postings and as the Australian Navy Aviation Force Element Group Commander.	
Navy	Commodore Peter James Marshall RAN	For exceptional service to the Royal Australian Navy as Commander Australian Navy Patrol Boat Force Element Group, Director General Naval Certification and Safety Agency, Director General Navy Systems Branch and Chief Naval Engineer.	
Navy	Captain Philip Spedding DSC, OAM, RAN	For exceptional performance of duty as the Commander, Combined Task Group 158.1 in the North Arabian Gulf on Operation CATALYST.	
Army	Brigadier Nicholas Stephen Bartels	For exceptional service to Australian Army Aviation, particularly as Commandant of the Army Aviation Training Centre and Commander 16th Aviation Brigade.	
Army	Brigadier Timothy James Hanna	For exceptional service to the Australian Army as Director Army Personnel Agency – Adelaide, as Commander 9th Brigade and as the Army Area Representative – South Australia.	
Army	Brigadier Donald George Higgins	For exceptional service while deployed on Operation CATALYST, and as a Senior Staff Officer and Deputy Commander within Special Operations Command.	
Army	Major General Craig William Orme CSC	For exceptional service as Director General Personnel Army and as Commander 1st Brigade.	
Army	Brigadier David Henry Saul	For exceptional service as Commander 17th Combat Service Support Brigade, Director Operations Headquarters Joint Logistic Command and Commanding Officer 3rd Combat Service Support Battalion.	
Army	Brigadier Andrew James Smith	For exceptional service as the Commander 7th Brigade, Joint Task Force 636 supporting the Melbourne 2006 Commonwealth Games and Joint Task Force 634 supporting the 2007 Asia Pacific Economic Conference.	
Army	Colonel Paul Edwin Straughair	For exceptional service as Director Network Centric Warfare – Army, Royal Australian Signals Head of Corps and Commandant of the Defence Force School of Signals.	
Air Force	Group Captain Alexander Ralph Cato RFD	For exceptional service to the Royal Australian Air Force Specialist Reserve as the Director of Air Force Health Reserves – Personnel, and Senior General Surgeon – deployable surgical elements within the Australian Defence Force.	
Air Force	Warrant Officer John Maddigan	For exceptional service as a Loadmaster with Air Lift Group, Royal Australian Air Force Base Richmond and Amberley, and as a member of the C-17A Globemaster Transition Team.	
Air Force	Air Commodore Margaret Mary Staib CSC	For exceptional service to the Royal Australian Air Force and Australian Defence Force in the field of logistics strategic planning as Director of Logistics Support Agency – Air Force and Director General Strategic Logistics, Joint Logistics Command.	
Air Force	Wing Commander Richard Greville Trotman-Dickenson	For exceptional service to the Royal Australian Air Force as the Intelligence Commander Joint Electronic Warfare Operational Support Unit and as Wing Commander Operations (Information Warfare) at Information Warfare Wing.	

=== Medal of the Order of Australia (OAM) ===
==== General Division ====
Recipient	Citation	Notes
Dr Thomas Frederick Acheson	For service to medicine as a general practitioner, through administrative roles with aged-care organisations, and to the community.	
Sylvia Munroe Aitken	For service to community welfare, particularly through the Silky Oaks Children's Haven.	
Dylan Martin Alcott	For service to sport as a Gold Medallist at the Beijing 2008 Paralympic Games.	
Edward Allen†	For service to the community through Lions International.	
Noel Ancell	For service to choral music, particularly through a range of youth choirs as an artistic director, voice tutor and administrator and through the promotion of Australian musical compositions.	
Barbara Albine Anderson	For service to rural and regional communities in central Queensland, particularly through support roles with Anglicare for families affected by drought, financial and mental health issues.	
Florence Catherine Anderson†	For service to the community of Rochester through a range of service organisations, particularly the Australian Red Cross and the Rochester and District Hospital Auxiliary.	
John David Anderson	For service to the community of Rochester through a range of historical, social welfare and sporting organisations.	
Shirley Claire Antonio	For service to the community through a range of multicultural organisations and programs and through the promotion and preservation of Polynesian culture.	
Dr Rodney Amarasinghe Arambewela	For service to the Sri Lankan community through the development of cultural and educational programs and the promotion of Australia-Sri Lanka business relations.	
Margaret Hazel Atkins	For service to the community through a range of children's welfare organisations.	
June Diana Bailey†	For service to youth through the Guiding and Scouting movements, and to the community.	
Angie Lee Bainbridge	For service to sport as a Gold Medallist at the Beijing 2008 Olympic Games.	
June Cecilia Baker	For service to education, and to the community of Parkes.	
Raymond Gordon "Ray" Baldwin	For service to veterans and their families through a range of roles with the 2/27th Battalion AIF Ex-Servicemen's Association.	
Terry Baldwin	For service to youth in the Northern Territory through the Goanna Park Land Association.	
George Hayden Bernard	For service to the community as a contributor to the development and coordination of vision improvement and eye health programs through Lions International.	
Bronte Amelia Barratt	For service to sport as a Gold Medallist at the Beijing 2008 Olympic Games.	
Bernard Michael Barron†	For service to the community of the Grafton region through contributions to a range of youth, sporting and service organisations, particularly Lions International.	
James William Beckensall	For service to the community, particularly children through the production and distribution of handmade toys to a range of charitable organisations.	
Keith Paul Beecher	For service to the performing arts through administrative roles with a range of organisations, and to the community.	
Neil Stanley Bennett	For service to the community of Stawell, particularly through the Country Fire Authority.	
Marie Bennetts	For service to surf lifesaving through the Kurrawa Surf Life Saving Club.	
Ann Bennison	For service to local government, particularly through the Queensland and Australian Local Government Associations, and to the community.	
Dennis Milton Betts	For service to education through teaching and administrative roles, to the development of youth training programs, and to the community of northern Tasmania.	
Walter Frederick Bishop	For service to the community through support for a range of charitable organisations, and to the music industry as a manager and promoter.	
Donald Alfred Blackam	For service to the community through philanthropic contributions to health, youth and dancesport organisations.	
Peter John Blom	For service to Rugby League football, and to the community of Tamworth.	
Jane Louise Bode	For service to international relations as a volunteer in the health care sector in Uganda, Mozambique and Tanzania.	
Myroslaw Boluch	For service to the Ukrainian community, particularly through the financial services sector and to the recording of the history of Ukrainian settlement in Australia.	
Jeffrey William Bond	For service to elite athletes and coaches as a leader in the development of sport and performance psychology.	
Raymond Helmut "Ray" Borner	For service to basketball as a player at the elite level, as a coach and administrator.	
Alfredo Bovier	For service to the community through contributions to the restaurant sector, to the promotion of Italian culture and as a supporter of charitable and arts organisations.	
Christopher Loyd Bowen	For service to choral music as a composer, conductor and director, particularly through the Sydney University Graduate Choir, and to music education.	
Valerie Ann Bradley	For service to the community of the Orange region, particularly through administrative roles in the aged care sector, and to the Uniting Church in Australia.	
Edward Charles Bramble	For service to the law, and to the community of the Sutherland Shire.	
Sam Julian Bramham	For service to sport as a Gold Medallist at the Beijing 2008 Paralympic Games.	
Dr Scott Michael Brennan	For service to sport as a Gold Medallist at the Beijing 2008 Olympic Games.	
The Reverend Father John Robert Briffa	For service to the community through contributions to the establishment and support of educational and aged care facilities, and to the Catholic church.	
Deidre Alison Brown	For service to the community, particularly through the Alumni Association of the University of Queensland.	
Garry Keith Brown	For service to education, particularly as Headmaster of Mosman Church of England Preparatory School, and through a range of professional associations.	
Mark Brinley Bryant	For service to people with disabilities through The Spastic Centre of New South Wales.	
Dr Ian Hugh Bunce RFD, ED	For service to medicine in the field of haematology through clinical and administrative roles, and to the Leukaemia Foundation of Queensland.	
Albert Louis Bergman	For service to the community of Wagga Wagga through a range of charitable, social welfare, veteran support and service organisations.	
Professor Louise Mary Burke	For service to sports nutrition as a dietician and through academic, research and administrative roles.	
Dr Christine Mary Bush	For service to the community of Lilydale as a general practitioner and through a range of health and local development organisations.	
Raymond Harvey Buttery	For service to veterans and their families through a range of ex-service and social welfare organisations.	
Robyn Elizabeth Byrne	For service to the community of the Inner South and Port Melbourne areas through health care and legal services organisations.	
Allan George Byrnes	For service to Rugby League football as a referee, administrator and historian, and to the community of Wollongong.	
Shirley Rosabel Caba	For service to the community of Coffs Harbour through social welfare and music programs.	
Bonnie Cameron	For service to the community of Barwon Heads through a range of service, sporting and church-related organisations.	
George Campbell	For service to the trade union movement through contributions to workplace relations, and to the Australian Labor Party.	
Keith William Campbell	For service to veterans, particularly through the Bomber Command Association in Australia, and to the community.	
Thomas Mayo Capell	For service to the community of the Parkes region, and to the grain industry.	
Antonio Caputo	For service to the Italian community of Sydney through executive and volunteer roles with a range of organisations providing assistance to migrants.	
Malcolm John Catford	For service to local government, to health care and arts organisations, and to the community of Jamestown.	
Kenneth Burdett Chadwick	For service to the community, particularly through the Sunshine Coast Concert Band.	
Norman Joseph Charles	For service to athletics in South Australia, particularly through coaching roles with Little Athletics organisations, and to the community.	
Stanley Clarence Chilcott	For service to children and families through the establishment of the Temcare family support program.	
David John Christie	For service to veterans and their families through a range of ex-service organisations, and to the community of Goodna.	
Keith Joseph Clarke	For service to the Indigenous community through contributions to housing, employment and education.	
Patrick William Clements	For service to the community of West Tamar through support for a range of ex-service, sporting and agricultural show organisations.	
Adjunct Professor David Vincent Cody	For service to medicine, particularly in the fields of cardiology and cardiac rehabilitation.	
Michael Colrain	For service to the performing arts as a musician, and to the community as a fundraiser and supporter of charitable organisations.	
Dr Martin Milton Comte	For service to music and arts education through teaching and administrative roles, and to professional organisations.	
Bruce Leo Conway	For service to the community through the provision of voluntary accountancy services to sporting, church and veterans’ organisations.	
Dr Bruce Alexander Cook	For service to education, particularly as Headmaster of The Southport School.	
Norma Frances Cooper	For service to the community of the Manly area through church, charitable and social welfare organisations.	
June Copeley	For service to local government, to sporting organisations, and to the community of Balga.	
Dr Bernard John Cormie	For service to the community as a general practitioner and through student support programs.	
William Jean Corneloup	For service to the French community of South Australia, particularly ex-service personnel, and to Australia-France relations.	
Gayle Corr	For service to the community of Arthurs Creek through contributions to emergency service, environmental and cultural organisations.	
Leonie Frederica Courtney-Bennett†	For service to people with a vision impairment through the Association for the Blind of Western Australia and as a teacher of Braille.	
Janet Isobel Cowles	For service to the communities of Ballarat and St Arnaud, particularly through the establishment and development of the Sovereign Hill historical village.	
William Bennett Crawford	For service to the community of the Bathurst region through a range of roles with local government and service organisations.	
David William Crawshay	For service to sport as a Gold Medallist at the Beijing 2008 Olympic Games.	
Sister May "Cecilia" Creigh	For service to people with a hearing impairment through advocacy, training and leadership roles, and to the Catholic church.	
Vera Lilian Crook	For service to the community, particularly through St John Ambulance Australia in Queensland.	
Clive Robertson Crouch	For service to conservation and the environment, particularly as a supporter of projects to protect the fauna and native vegetation of the Wimmera and Mallee regions of western Victoria.	
Roger Geoffrey Cundell	For service to veterans and their families, and to the community through a range of service, nature conservation, and heritage organisations.	
George Edward Curphey	For service to the community through the administration of the Sylvia and Charles Viertel Charitable Foundation.	
Harvey William Cuthill	For service to pharmacy through the Pharmacy Guild of Australia, and to the community of Launceston through service, health and sporting organisations.	
Dr Farvardin Daliri	For service to the community of north Queensland, particularly through roles with multicultural organisations and events.	
Lara Shiree Davenport	For service to sport as a Gold Medallist at the Beijing 2008 Olympic Games.	
Patricia Ann Davey	For service to the community, particularly as a foster parent.	
Raymond Kevin Davey	For service to the community, particularly as a foster parent.	
Edward George Davidson	For service to the community of Townsville, particularly through Rotary International and as a contributor to programs assisting youth at risk.	
Ronald Christopher Davidson	For service to education, particularly to people with special needs, through the Specific Learning Difficulties Association, Victoria.	
Melville John "Mel" Davies	For service to the community in the fields of mining history and veterans’ cycling.	
Graeme Ross Davis	For service to the community, particularly through the Rotary Club of Deloraine and through a range of arts organisations.	
Susan Claire Daw	For service to people with a hearing impairment through teaching, training and executive roles with Better Hearing Australia.	
Elissa Hilary Demeny	For service to people with a disability, particularly through Manly Sailability.	
John Milne Dibben	For service to the community of Adelaide through a range of church, social welfare and disability organisations.	
Ronald "Glen" Dix	For service to motorsport, particularly the Australian Formula One Grand Prix, and to the community through Camp Quality.	
Victor Alan Doig	For service to surf lifesaving through the promotion of new resuscitation methods, and to engineering.	
Joseph "Denis" Donnelly	For service to education as a teacher and contributor to school sports.	
Arthur John Douglas	For service to aviation as a pilot, instructor and contributor to a range of industry bodies, and to the community.	
James George Douglas	For service to people with a hearing impairment through the Western Australian Deaf Society.	
Tom Anthony Doumanis	For service to football in New South Wales through executive roles with a range ofsporting clubs and organisations, and to the community.	
Robert Colin Dove	For service to the community through Lions Clubs International Australia, and to the accounting profession.	
Brendan John Dowler	For service to sport as a Gold Medallist at the Beijing 2008 Paralympic Games.	
Phillip "Graeme" Downie	For service to Australian Rules football through administrative roles, and to the tourism industry in Queensland.	
Anne Marie Drake†	For service to local government, and to the community of Rosebery through a range of sporting and ex-service organisations.	
John Lewis Draper	For service to the community through the Victorian Railways Returned Servicemen's Association and the Retired Railway Employee Association of Victoria.	
Allan Drew	For service to the community through a range of charity and service organisations, and to the funeral industry.	
Rodney James Driver	For service to the Trade Union movement, and to the community of the Australian Capital Territory.	
Oliver "Melvyn" Duffy	For service to the visual arts as a landscape painter.	
Kenneth McLeod Duncan	For service to the arts as a landscape photographer and publisher, and to the community of the Central Coast of New South Wales.	
Lieutenant Colonel Graham John "Moose" Dunlop (Retired)	For service to veterans through the Royal Australian Regiment Association, and to youth, particularly through Operation Flinders.	
Matthew Stephen Dunn	For service to swimming, and to the community through Asthma Foundations Australia.	
Leslie Eileen East	For service to the community, particularly through the mentoring of youth and through a range of charitable organisations.	
Barry Maxwell Easther	For service to local government, and to the community of the West Tamar region.	
The Reverend Donald Haslam Edgar	For service to the Anglican Church of Australia, and to support programs for refugees.	
Elizabeth Helen Ellis	For service to librarianship through a range of professional roles with the State Library of New South Wales.	
Mavis Elvira Euling	For service to the community of the Shepparton region through aged care, youth and charitable organisations.	
Justin Cain Eveson	For service to sport as a Gold Medallist at the Beijing 2008 Paralympic Games.	
Douglas Newton Farmer	For service to veterans and their families, and to the community of Kingaroy.	
Jean Elsie Ferguson	For service to literature and the bookselling industry, and to the community of Wollongong.	
Malcolm Liney Ferguson	For service to the community of the Australian Capital Territory through social welfare and charitable organisations and the School Volunteer Program.	
Thomas Ford AFSM	For service to the community of Ballarat through school, sporting and service organisations.	
Alan Foskett	For service to the community of the Australian Capital Territory through the preservation and documentation of the history of the region.	
Commander John Douglas Foster RAN (Retired)	For service to the recording of Australian naval history and the search for the submarine HMAS AE1 lost during World War One.	
Donald John Franklin	For service to the community of Beaudesert through business, cultural and charitable organisations.	
Ross Charles Fraser	For service to the livestock transport industry through a range of executive roles, and to the community of Warwick.	
Duncan Seth Free	For service to sport as a Gold Medallist at the Beijing 2008 Olympic Games.	
Lesley June Freeman	For service to the community of the Gold Coast through a range of charitable, youth and social welfare organisations.	
Maria "Luisa" Fuller	For service to multiculturalism, particularly through assistance and support to migrant communities in south east Queensland.	
Brian Terence Gallagher	For service to the community of Hobart, particularly through Southern Cross Care and to a range of charitable and social welfare organisations.	
Michael Thomas Gallagher	For service to sport as a Gold Medallist at the Beijing 2008 Paralympic Games.	
Felicity Madeline Galvez	For service to sport as a Gold Medallist at the Beijing 2008 Paralympic Games.	
Kenneth John Gallagher	For service to youth through the Scouting movement.	
John Alan Geddie	For service to the community, particularly through the Hare Street Uniting Church and ethnic community radio.	
Patricia Geidans	For service to education and to the community, particularly through the Society for the Study of Early Christianity.	
Margaret Glenys Gibbs	For service to the community, particularly through the Tasmanian Bridge Association as a player and administrator.	
Karla Nicole Gilbert	For service to surf lifesaving as a competitor, and to the community.	
Susan Amelia Glasfurd	For service to international relations through the Australian American Association.	
Marion Gosper	For service to the community of Cudal though a range of social welfare and service organisations.	
Helen Marie Grainer	For service to the community of Holroyd through a range of initiatives providing support to refugees, the elderly and youth.	
Howard Charles Grant	For service to the community through the Canberra Woden Lions Club.	
Hilton Gordon Greaves	For service to veterans and their families, and to the community of Taree.	
Raymond Charles Green	For service to rowing through a range of administrative and coaching roles and as a competitor, and to the community of the Blue Mountains.	
Robin Herrod Green	For service to the community of Ipswich through a range of roles with ex-service, charitable, historical and sporting organisations.	
Carol Anne Greening	For service to the Mannum district, particularly through youth and community development organisations.	
Peter Ronald Grieve	For service to primary industry through the promotion of the Angus cattle breed.	
Dr Alison Isabel Gyger	For service to the arts and the community, particularly through the publication of the journal Opera-Opera.	
David Elliott Gyger	For service to the arts and the community, particularly through the publication of the journal Opera-Opera.	
Neville George Halligan	For service to veterans’ tennis as a player and administrator.	
Ruth Crossman Harrington	For service to veterans through the South Australian Branch of the Returned Services League of Australia.	
Joseph George Harris	For service to the community through a range of service and charitable organisations.	
Judith Anne Harris	For service to the community of the Australian Capital Territory, particularly through the Winnunga Nimmityjah Aboriginal Health Service.	
Michael Mathew Hartnett	For service to the community of Launceston through the Scouting movement, the Baptist church and a range of sporting organisations.	
Ian Christopher Haskins	For service to the community of the Mornington Peninsula, particularly through the Nepean Conservation Group.	
Dr Kelvin John Hastie	For service to the community through the conservation, documentation and restoration of pipe organs.	
Andrew Havas	For service to the community through the promotion of cultural diversity and understanding.	
Donald Raymond Hawking RFD	For service to youth through the Army Cadet movement, and to the community through a range of sporting and service organisations.	
Professor Barbara Ann Hayes	For service to nursing, midwifery and mental health, particularly the facilitation of Indigenous student participation and perinatal anxiety and depression awareness, through education initiatives and research.	
Ian Charles Heath	For service to youth through the Scouting movement.	
Arthur Bealby Helyard	For service to the community, particularly the welfare of prison inmates through a range of service organisations.	
Yvonne Josephine Henderson	For service to the community, particularly the welfare of prison inmates through a range of service organisations.	
Dr Robert Gordon Henry	For service to dentistry in the field of orthodontics as a practitioner, administrator and teacher, and to the community.	
David Norman Heussner	For service to the surf lifesaving movement through a range of executive, coaching and competitor roles, and to canoeing.	
Dr Gary Philip Hewett	For service to the development of cross-cultural educational exchanges between Western Australia and Cambodia, and the establishment of services for children orphaned by HIV/AIDS.	
David Reginald Hewitt	For service to remote Indigenous communities as a tradesman and volunteer relief worker, and to the community through preservation of the history of early European exploration in desert regions.	
Margaret May Hewitt	For service to remote Indigenous communities as a tradesman and volunteer relief worker, and to the community through preservation of the history of early European exploration in desert regions.	
Evelyn Hill	For service to the community, particularly through the Castle Hill Art Society and St Matthew's Anglican Church at West Pennant Hills.	
Robyn Anne Hobbs	For service to the community as the founder of Carols in the Domain, to the Salvation Army through fundraising, and to the Anglican Church of Australia.	
Colonel James Frederick Hodgson ED (Retired)	For service to the welfare of veterans and their families, and to a range of organisations in the Newcastle and Hunter area.	
Dorothy Fay Hoepner	For service to the community through a range of organisations in the Balaklava region.	
Esmond Wilfred Hoepner	For service to the community of Balaklava through roles in local government, church and health service organisations.	
Barbara Ann Hogbin	For service to the community through a range of swimming programs.	
Steven Leslie Hooker	For service to sport as a Gold Medallist at the Beijing 2008 Olympic Games.	
Dr Marsden Carr Hordern VRD	For service to the recording of Australian maritime history, particularly early exploration and naval history during World War Two.	
Dean Athol Hunt	For service to music, particularly through brass and concert bands and as a mentor of young musicians.	
Patricia Joan Jacka	For service to local government through the Clare and Gilbert Valleys Council, and to the community through a range of organisations.	
Kenneth William Jacobs	For service to cricket, particularly through executive roles with Cricket Victoria and programs promoting the development of cricket in schools, and to the community.	
Dale Thomas Jennings	For service to the community of Geelong through a range of charitable, social welfare and business organisations.	
Ronald Frederick Johansen	For service to the Murwillumbah Historical Society, and to the community through a range of organisations.	
Anne Imelda Johanson	For service to the community through voluntary roles with Belmont Meals on Wheels.	
Robert Keith Johns	For service to the mineral resources and energy sector in South Australia through a range of research and administrative roles.	
David Matthew Johnston	For service to music and the community, particularly through organ performances, installations and restorations and fundraising events.	
Dr Adrian Neil Jones	For service to history education as a lecturer and author, and through executive roles with a range of historical and teaching associations.	
Frederick Norman Joughin	For service to sport, particularly through the Tasmanian University Soccer Club.	
Dr Franciscus "Frank" Junius	For service to medicine through research and clinical innovations in the use of the heart-lung machine and the improved outcomes for patients.	
Noel Charles Jupp	For service to the community and to horticulture, particularly through revegetation programs and the cultivation of native flora.	
Demetrius Athanasius Kalatzis	For service to the Greek community through consular support and the Scouting movement, and to the development of Freemasonry in South Australia.	
Raymond Lionel Kassel	For service to the community through a range of roles with aged care organisations.	
Ivan David Kayne	For service to the community through a range of charitable, health and service organisations.	
Marlene Kear	For service to the community of Mudjimba through a range of roles with conservation, youth and service organisations.	
William Walter Kear	For service to the community, particularly through the Mudjimba Progress Association and Bush Fire Brigade, and to a range of conservation and service organisations.	
Claudia Keech	For service to the community through raising awareness of the issues surrounding the roles of women in the workforce and at home.	
Lane Brendan Kelly	For service to the community of Geelong West, particularly through the St Peters Football Club.	
Dr Michael John Kennedy	For service to the community through health and sporting organisations, particularly Life Saving Victoria, and to local government.	
Ernest George Kidd	For service to Lions Australia, and to the community of Ryde through a range of organisations.	
Charles Kiefel	For service to the superannuation and funds management industries, and to the community as a supporter of charitable and educational organisations.	
Marie Jean Kilpatrick	For service to the community of Blacktown, particularly through the Australian Red Cross.	
Adrian John King	For service to sport as a Gold Medallist at the Beijing 2008 Paralympic Games.	
Noelene Elizabeth King	For service to primary industry through the agricultural show movement in Victoria, and as a mentor to youth within the rural sector.	
Gary James Kirk	For service to the community through the Central Coast Men's Barbershop Chorus and a range of sporting and service organisations.	
Geoffrey Lewis Klug	For service to medicine, particularly in the field of paediatric neurosurgery, as a clinician and mentor to professional organisations, and to the community.	
Alice Isabel Knight	For service to the community of Linton and district through a range of natural resource management, emergency service and church organisations.	
Kathlyn Mary Knight	For service to the retail property industry, particularly through the Property Council of Australia.	
Tristan Malcolm Knowles	For service to sport as a Gold Medallist at the Beijing 2008 Paralympic Games.	
Arthur McKee Krust	For service to the building and construction industry, and to the community through church and service groups.	
Beverly Jane Laing	For service to the community of Parkes, particularly through a range of local government, service and welfare organisations.	
Carolyn Langsford	For service to people with multiple sclerosis through the establishment and development of the Trish MS Research Foundation.	
Ian "Roy" Langsford	For service to people with multiple sclerosis through the establishment and development of the Trish MS Research Foundation.	
Kenneth Reginald Langshaw	For service to the community through the Anglican Church of Australia and the Byron Place Community Centre.	
Anthony Joseph Lanza	For service to the community of Brisbane through the formation of The Anti-Graffiti Group.	
Elizabeth Ann Lanza	For service to the community of Brisbane through the formation of The Anti-Graffiti Group.	
Tyson John Lawrence	For service to sport as a Gold Medallist at the Beijing 2008 Paralympic Games.	
Valda Janet Lawrence	For service to local government through the Borough of Queenscliffe Council, and to the community.	
Harry Leaver	For service to the community, particularly through historical research of early explorers in the Western Australia region.	
Amen Kwai Lee	For service to the community, particularly through to the promotion of understanding between the people of Australia and China.	
Associate Professor Chee-Seong Lee	For service to veterinary education and research, to international student welfare at the University of Melbourne, and to the community through the Burwood Community Presbyterian Church.	
Henry Frederick Leech	For service to the community of Dunkeld through a range of organisations, particularly the Dunkeld Sub-Branch of the Returned and Services League of Australia.	
Peter Alan Leek	For service to sport as a Gold Medallist at the Beijing 2008 Paralympic Games.	
Jane Antill Lemann	For service to the environment, particularly through the Mount Gibraltar Landcare and Bushcare Group, and to the community of the Wingecarribee Shire.	
Gordon Lewis	For service to the community of the Southern Highlands region through a range of local government, sporting and service organisations.	
Commodore James Gervys Longden RAN (Retired)	For service to the community of Eden-Monaro and the Australian Capital Territory through the Anglican church and a range of service organisations.	
John Mountiford "Jock" Longfield	For service to the agricultural show movement, and to the community of Quirindi.	
Malcolm Borland Longstaff	For service to the community through a range of maritime, social welfare, youth and cultural organisations.	
Pamela Scott Lord	For service to the community of Broken Hill, particularly through the Broken Hill Base Hospital and the Royal Flying Doctor Service Women's Auxiliary.	
Juan "Carlos" Loyola	For service to disability sport, particularly through the Doveton Special Soccer School.	
Christine Lynch	For service to the Greek community of New South Wales through a range of cultural and charitable organisations.	
Lieutenant Colonel Edward Thomas Lynes RFD, ED (Retired)	For service to the community, particularly ex-service personnel.	
Margaret Therese "Terry" Lyons	For service to the community of Yarrawonga, particularly through roles in various cultural, service and church organisations.	
Robert Henry Lytton	For service to the community of Forbes through a range of seniors, aged care, educational and service groups.	
Dr Michael Joseph McAulliffe	For service to the community of the Cairns region as a general practitioner and Government Medical Officer.	
John Harris MacColl	For service to the community through the promotion and development of cultural, educational and business relationships between Australia and France.	
Robin McKay	For service to the community of Penrith and the Nepean district, particularly through business, religious, educational and service organisations and significant contributions to the architecture of the area.	
Linda June MacKenzie	For service to sport as a Gold Medallist at the Beijing 2008 Olympic Games.	
Helen Mae McKerrow	For service to the communities of Mount Isa and Cloncurry through a range of welfare, arts and youth organisations.	
James MacLachlan	For service to the community through roles in the Palerang and Yarrowlumla Shire Councils, the Rural Fire Service, the Scouting movement and other service and sporting organisations.	
Gordon Lindsay McMaster	For service to the merino wool industry and the kelpie working sheep dog industry.	
Jenny McNae	For service to the performing arts, particularly theatre, as a director, actor and mentor of young artists.	
Donald Duncan McNeice	For service to football as an administrator, coach and referee, and to the community through youth and ex-service organisations.	
Associate Professor Ian Bruce McPhee	For service to medicine in the field of orthopaedic surgery, as a clinician, academic, educator, researcher and contributor to professional organisations.	
Neil Ormiston MacPherson	For service to the community, particularly through the establishment of the Burma Thailand Railway Memorial Association, and to raising the awareness of the prisoners of war experience.	
Donald Phillip McSweeny	For service to Australian Rules football in South Australia through a range of administrative roles, and to the communities of Cummins and Port Lincoln.	
Robert Geoffrey Mainwaring	For service to state and local government, and to the communities of Flinders Island and the Launceston region.	
William Kingsnorth Mallyon	For service to the community, and to the environment, particularly through roles in the preservation of the Adelaide Hills.	
Patrick Francis Manning	For service to surf lifesaving, particularly through coaching and administrative roles.	
Waninya Gary Marika	For service to the community of Yirrkala through cultural liaison.	
Pauline Anne Marlborough	For service to education, particularly as a specialist teacher working with students with special needs, and through the Socio Psychological Education Resource Centre (WA).	
Robert "Bruce" Marshall	For service to the community of Bacchus Marsh and surrounding district, particularly through improvements in local health services.	
Robert Quentin Marshall	For service to the environment through the establishment and maintenance of sustainable walking trails.	
Dr Bruce Bamford Martin	For service to ophthalmology as a practitioner and teacher, to people with a vision impairment, and to the community.	
Bruce Bernard Martin	For service to the thoroughbred horseracing industry, particularly as a broadcaster and administrator, and to the community through charitable organisations.	
William Harold Marwick	For service to the communities of Wanneroo and Joondalup, particularly through documentation of the region's history, and to the newspaper industry.	
Brian Raymond Mathews	For service to the community, particularly through roles with veteran car clubs and the establishment of the National Automobile Museum of Tasmania Foundation.	
Alexander Muir Mathieson	For service to the print media industry, and to the community, particularly through the Operation Flinders Foundation.	
Patrick Anthony Meacle	For service to local government, and to the communities of the Tara Shire through a range of organisations including the Flinton Race Club.	
Vasiliki Megaloconomos	For service to the Greek community, particularly through organisations providing assistance to the elderly, and to the community of Carinda.	
Irene Mellios	For service to the Greek community of Darwin, and to the Cancer Council of the Northern Territory.	
Douglas John Meyer	For service to the community, particularly through the Henty Machinery Field Days Co-operative.	
Lindsay Douglas Millar	For service to the community through the Royal Flying Doctor Service and the Tasmanian Aero Club.	
Narelle Dawn Milton	For service to the community through the Uniting Church in Australia Coffs Harbour 'Soup Place'.	
Tony Misich	For service to education, particularly through the development and implementation of new initiatives in primary schools and to the Western Australian and Australian Primary Principals' Associations.	
Matthew John Mitcham	For service to sport as a Gold Medallist at the Beijing 2008 Olympic Games.	
Grant Karlis Mizens	For service to sport as a Gold Medallist at the Beijing 2008 Paralympic Games.	
Marlene Monahan	For service to education through the Catholic primary school system, and to the community.	
Stephen Gerard Moore	For service to the community through the Narrabri Shire Band and the rural fire service, and to agriculture through plant breeding.	
Nigel Graham Morgan†	For service to the community through support for charitable, youth, social welfare and cultural organisations.	
Colin Francis Morris	For service to the community of Blacktown through sporting and charitable organisations.	
Robert David Moss	For service to youth through the Australian Air Force Cadets.	
Deslee Mavis Moyle	For service to the community through the collection and preservation of photographic records of the Australian Churches of Christ Indigenous Ministries in Western Australia.	
Christopher James "Chris" Mullins	For service to sport as a Gold Medallist at the Beijing 2008 Paralympic Games.	
Bradley John "Brad" Ness	For service to sport as a Gold Medallist at the Beijing 2008 Paralympic Games.	
Fay Louisa Newell	For service to the community of Broken Hill as a nursing sister, mentor to nurses and allied health professionals, palliative care volunteer and historian.	
Ross Howard Newton	For service to the community of Highett, and to philately through roles with the Brighton Philatelic Society.	
Phung Dang Nguyen	For service to the Vietnamese community, and to martial arts as a Taekwondo instructor.	
Linda Olive Nixon	For service to the community of the Busselton region through roles with health and aged care organisations, and to hockey.	
The Reverend Father Neville Douglas Nixon	For service to the Anglican Church of Australia and to the community through Anglican Aid Abroad.	
Shaun Daryl Norris	For service to sport as a Gold Medallist at the Beijing 2008 Paralympic Games.	
John Henry O'Connor	For service to the community as an entertainer, particularly through fundraising events for children's charitable organisations.	
John Kevin O'Gorman BM	For service to the community through Police Remembrance Day and the Queensland Police Union.	
Evan George O'Hanlon	For service to sport as a Gold Medallist at the Beijing 2008 Paralympic Games.	
Barbara Alison Oldfield	For service to the community through respite care support services.	
Denis William O'Meara	For service to the environment through native plant propagation and revegetation programs, to the mining industry, and to the community of the Pilbara region.	
Laszlo George Ory	For service to the Hungarian community in South Australia, and to a range of charitable organisations.	
Dierdre Helen Owen	For service to the welfare of veterans through roles with the South Australian Women's Auxiliary of the Returned and Services League of Australia, and to lacrosse.	
Clive Joseph Owens	For service to the community, particularly through the surf lifesaving movement.	
Malcolm George Page	For service to sport as a Gold Medallist at the Beijing 2008 Olympic Games.	
John Edward Palmer	For service to youth in central west and north west Queensland through roles with athletics organisations and the Scouting movement, and to the community.	
Kylie Jayne Palmer	For service to sport as a Gold Medallist at the Beijing 2008 Olympic Games.	
Kathleen Papallo	For service to the community as a church organist and choir conductor.	
Tessa Parkinson	For service to sport as a Gold Medallist at the Beijing 2008 Olympic Games.	
Agapitos "Jack" Passaris	For service to the community, particularly through the Ethnic Communities Council of New South Wales, and to local government.	
Marie Patapanian	For service to the Armenian community in the area of aged care.	
Rick Pendleton	For service to sport as a Gold Medallist at the Beijing 2008 Paralympic Games.	
Rebel Penfold-Russell	For service to the community, particularly through philanthropic support for the arts and a range of charitable organisations.	
Ninon Rosa Phillips	For service to animal welfare through the care, treatment and rehabilitation of Australian wildlife, and to the arts as an illustrator and artist.	
Rodney John Polkinghorne	For service to the meat and livestock industries through research and the development of a standard beef grading system.	
Katrina Porter	For service to sport as a Gold Medallist at the Beijing 2008 Paralympic Games.	
Richard Gwyn Pritchard	For service to the welfare of veterans, particularly through the Canley Heights Sub-Branch of the Returned and Services League of Australia.	
Philip Andrew Pullar	For service to agriculture, particularly through development of the canned fruit industry, to the community of Cobram, and to the sport of diving.	
Albert James Puxley†	For service to the community of Victor Harbor.	
Phyllis Margaret Quick	For service to the community of Ballarat and district through the Country Women's Association of Victoria and contributions to a range of choral groups.	
Vettath Tara Rajkumar	For service to the performing arts as a teacher, choreographer and performer of classical Indian dance.	
Elise Marie Rechichi	For service to sport as a Gold Medallist at the Beijing 2008 Olympic Games.	
Norma June Rees	For service to the community of Darebin through the management of volunteers and coordination of community support services.	
Shayne Leanne Reese	For service to sport as a Gold Medallist at the Beijing 2008 Olympic Games.	
Stephanie Louise Rice	For service to sport as a Gold Medallist at the Beijing 2008 Olympic Games.	
Alexander Gordon Rickard†	For service to education through a range of teaching and administrative roles and the development of enrichment programs for primary school students.	
Barbara Mary Roberts	For service to ophthalmic nursing and the establishment of ambulatory day surgery centres in the Sydney area, and to people in Papua New Guinea, Cambodia and Myanmar through eye care and treatment centres.	
Erskine Hamilton Rodan	For service to the law, particularly through the Law Institute of Victoria, and to the community through legal aid and as an advocate for refugees.	
Dennis John Roles	For service to the community through advocacy roles supporting former and serving members of the Australian Defence Force and their families.	
Richard John Rolfe	For service to the community of Canberra through philanthropic support for sporting, service and charitable organisations.	
Dr Robert Henry Ross	For service to medicine as a general practitioner, and to the communities of the Riverland region of South Australia.	
Christopher Alan Ross-Smith	For service to the performing arts, and to the community of the Armidale region.	
William Anthony Rudd	For service to the community through historical research of Allied Prisoners of War in Europe.	
Garth Lindsay "Garry" Rumble	For service to the community of Penrith, particularly through Rotary International, and to local government.	
James Stewart Rutherford	For service to the community of Wyong, particularly through Lions International.	
Jayne Stoddart Salmon	For service to the community of Geelong through the Friends of Geelong Botanic Gardens.	
Ian Bruce Samuel	For service to the community, particularly through the promotion of tolerance and social justice.	
Giovanni Antonio "John" Sanna	For service to the community of Orbost as a volunteer with health, aged care and social welfare organisations.	
Melanie Renée Schlanger	For service to sport as a Gold Medallist at the Beijing 2008 Olympic Games.	
George Hector Schofield	For service to the greyhound racing industry, to the health and welfare of dogs, and as an animal chiropractor.	
Ian David "Shooey" Schuback	For service to lawn bowls as a coach, competitor and commentator.	
Mark Schwarzer	For service to football, particularly as an international representative player, and to the community.	
William Noel Searle	For service to the community of Bundaberg, particularly through Lions Australia.	
David George Seaton	For service to the community through roles with medical education, health administration and charitable organisations, and as Honorary Consul for Sweden in South Australia.	
Emily Jane Seebohm	For service to sport as a Gold Medallist at the Beijing 2008 Olympic Games.	
Barbara Joan Shephard	For service to the community of Coen, particularly in the areas of education and emergency services as a remote area nurse.	
Lyle Margaret Shore	For service to the community of Dee Why, particularly veterans and their families.	
Ronald David Siddons MBE	For service to people with a disability through the Rainbow Club Australia, and to the community of the Sutherland Shire.	
Tige Arthur Simmons	For service to sport as a Gold Medallist at the Beijing 2008 Paralympic Games.	
Dennise Simpson	For service to the protection of women and children living with abuse and violence, particularly through the Domestic Violence Crisis Service and the Family Violence Intervention Program in the Australian Capital Territory.	
Ann Marie Sinclair	For service to the community as a volunteer, particularly through the Grafton Uniting Church.	
Dr Donald Arthur Sinclair	For service to the community, particularly through the Ryder-Cheshire Foundation, to education and to a range of professional associations.	
Rosemary Dale Skelly	For service to the community of the Redland region, particularly through a range of welfare, health and service organisations, and to local government.	
David Leslie Skewes	For service to the community of Yarrawonga through roles with a range of recreational, aged-care and social welfare organisations.	
Barrie James Smith	For service to the community, particularly youth, through leadership roles in surf lifesaving.	
Claudia Mary Smith	For service to the community, particularly through the Catholic church, as an organist and a volunteer.	
Warren Harold Smith	For service to cricket in New South Wales through coaching roles at state, regional and local levels.	
Gloria Smythe	For service to the arts and the sport of swimming as a designer, teacher and author.	
Emma Laura Snowsill	For service to sport as a Gold Medallist at the Beijing 2008 Olympic Games.	
Pamela Elizabeth "Pam" Soper	For service to the environment through executive roles with conservation organisations and the promotion of natural resource management.	
Margaret Joan Spalding	For service to the disability services sector in the Australian Capital Territory and surrounding region.	
Harold Neville "Harry" Spencer	For service to basketball as a coach at local, state and national level, and to the community of Toowoomba.	
Dr Malcolm Lees Stening VRD	For service to medicine as a gynaecological surgeon, and to the community through the recording of naval history.	
Jean Elizabeth Stewart	For service to the community through the preservation and promotion of local history and heritage.	
Brett Andrew Stibners	For service to sport as a Gold Medallist at the Beijing 2008 Paralympic Games.	
Professor David Frederick Story	For service to medical education and research, particularly in the field of pharmacology, through contributions to therapeutic regulation and the development of evidence-based Chinese medicine as an academic discipline.	
Margaret Sumner	For service to lawn bowls through administrative and representative roles.	
Stephen Sanchez Sunk	For service to education through curriculum design and development and as a teacher, to the Indigenous communities of the Northern Territory, and to professional organisations.	
Monsignor Joseph Karim Takchi	For service to the Lebanese community of Victoria as a Parish Priest, and to youth and the aged through a range of educational and care initiatives.	
Judith Helen Talbot	For service to the community of Brunswick Junction and the Shire of Harvey.	
Shirley Doreen Thompson	For service to the communities of Bonshaw, Ashford and region through the Country Women's Association and the agricultural show movement.	
Dr Harold William Thurlow	For service to the community as a general practitioner and volunteer medical officer with a range of sporting organisations.	
William Robert "Bill" Trevor	For service to local government through a range of roles, and to the community of Childers and the Wide Bay Burnett region.	
Commodore Robert Neil Trotter RAN (Retired)	For service to the community as a contributor to the successful search for HMAS Sydney.	
Adrian Roy Twitt	For service to the community of Wangaratta through a range of community and charitable organisations.	
Leslie Ronald "Ron" Tyrell	For service to local government, and to the community of Thuringowa.	
Desmond Ronald Upton	For service to boxing as a player, coach and mentor, and to the community of central Queensland, particularly through support for Indigenous and disadvantaged youth.	
Catherine Rhondda Vanzella	For service to politics through roles with the Liberal Party of Australia, and to the community.	
Roslyn Wilga Vaughan	For service to the community through support for Cystic Fibrosis NSW.	
Dr Phuoc Vo	For service to medicine and to medical organisations, to the Vietnamese community in Australia, and to the Vietnam Vision Program.	
Allan Mervyn Waddle	For service to the community through a range of justice, business, sporting and service organisations.	
Max Wahlhaus†	For service to education, particularly through curriculum development in the areas of Hebrew language and Jewish history, and as a teacher.	
Paul Thomas Wakeling	For service to the communities of Campbelltown and Macarthur through philanthropic contributions to a range of health and social welfare organisations.	
Charles Gilmour Wallace	For service to veterans and their families in the Central Coast region of New South Wales.	
Kenneth Maxwell Wallace	For service to sport as a Gold Medallist at the Beijing 2008 Olympic Games.	
Jock Campbell Wallis	For service to the community of Seymour through contributions to natural resource management, historical and service organisations.	
Margaret Clarice Wallis	For service to the community of Seymour through contributions to aged care, social family welfare and historical organisations.	
Ronald James "Jim" Walliss	For service to the community of the Shoalhaven region, to the environment, and to education.	
Ian Douglas Ward	For service to veterans through the coordination and organisation of commemorative and remembrance programs, and to the community.	
Dr Gail Marion Waterhouse	For service to the community through the provision of humanitarian aid to the people of Vietnam.	
Terence Stanley Weeks APM	For service to the community of Ararat through roles with a range of service, charitable and social welfare organisations.	
Dr Robert Leslie Weiland	For service to education in Western Australia, particularly for children with special learning needs.	
James Gwydir Whalan	For service to veterans and their families through contributions to ex-service organisations, and to the community.	
Jeanette Ann Wheeler	For service to the community through training and support roles with social welfare and youth organisations.	
Frederick Herbert White	For service to veterans and their families, particularly through the Lindisfarne Sub-Branch of the Returned and Services League of Australia.	
Tarnee Renee White	For service to sport as a Gold Medallist at the Beijing 2008 Olympic Games.	
Wendy Susan Whiteley	For service to the community through the establishment and maintenance of a public garden at Lavender Bay, and as a supporter of the visual arts.	
Juna Lovina Whittaker	For service to international relations in the Pacific region through education, training and development in the field of public administration, and to the community.	
Leigh Carruthers Wigglesworth	For service to music as an artistic director and choral conductor, and to the community.	
Rosemary Elizabeth "Rose" Wight	For service to the arts, particularly through executive roles with the Adelaide Festival of Ideas.	
Elizabeth Anne Wilkes	For service to the community of Templestowe, particularly through roles with social welfare and church organisations.	
Nathan James Wilmot	For service to sport as a Gold Medallist at the Beijing 2008 Olympic Games.	
Dr Chester Gilmore Wilson	For service to rural and remote medicine as a general practitioner, and to the community of Charleville.	
Norman Rex Wilson	For service to local government, and to the community of Warren.	
Paul Dean Wilson DFC	For service to veterans through ex-service organisations, particularly the 462/466 Squadrons Reunion Association.	
Christine Ingrid Wolf	For service to sport as a Gold Medallist at the Beijing 2008 Paralympic Games.	
Grace Eileen Woolcock	For service to the community of Lambton, particularly through contributions to Meals on Wheels.	
Clive Thomas Woosnam	For service to the community through roles with cultural and musical societies, and to education.	
James "Chien-li" Wu	For service to education, particularly through the development of Chinese language teaching, as a teacher, and to the community.	
Sarkis Yedelian	For service to the Armenian community through the promotion and development of multicultural integration initiatives, and to local government.	
Joy Louise Yeo	For service to education through executive and administrative roles, to professional associations, and to the community.	
Dr Leonard Neville Young	For service to medicine in rural and remote areas as a physician and through professional organisations.	
Leonard Frank Yow	For service to the Chinese community through a range of roles with cultural, historical, social welfare and religious organisations.	
Ian Arthur Zirbel	For service to the community of Goondiwindi through a range of youth, sporting, historical and service groups.	

==== Military Division ====
Branch	Recipient	Citation	Notes
Navy	Warrant Officer Mark Rodney Budden	For meritorious service as the Chief of the Boat, HMAS Waller, from 2001 to 2004 and from 2006 to 2008 and in the Australian Fleet Sea Training Group between 2004 and 2006.	
Navy	Commander Geoffrey Ronald Cannon RANR	For meritorious service to the Royal Australian Navy in the field of Weapons Electrical Engineering and the support and development of Combat Data Systems and Weapons Systems.	
Navy	Lieutenant Commander Peter Anthony de Maskens RAN	For meritorious service in the field of maritime communications and information systems.	
Navy	Warrant Officer Mark Raymond Donlan	For meritorious service throughout his career in the Royal Australian Navy, particularly as the inaugural Officer-in-Charge of the Local Career Management Centre at Fleet Base East.	
Army	Corporal Scott Graeme Crutchett	For meritorious service on Operations CATALYST and ASTUTE between 2004 and 2008.	
Army	Warrant Officer Class One David Anthony Hatton	For meritorious service as the Regimental Sergeant Major of the Combat Training Centre (Live) and the 2nd Battalion, The Royal Australian Regiment.	
Army	Warrant Officer Class One Robert Pontifex CSM	For meritorious service in the fields of Materiel Maintenance and Army Career Management.	
Army	Captain Brenton Luke White	For meritorious service as the Squadron Sergeant Major of the 21st Construction Squadron, Staff Officer Grade Three Land Command Engineers, and Operations Officer at the Army Explosive Hazards Centre.	
Air Force	Wing Commander Timothy John Hurford	For meritorious service to the Royal Australian Air Force in the development of the Air Force Reserves as Commanding Officer Number 25 Squadron and as Officer-inCharge of the Training Development and Executive Officer Number 1 Airfield Defence Squadron	
Air Force	Flight Lieutenant Gregory Roy Kerr	For meritorious service as a Flight Engineer at Number 92 Wing.	

== Meritorious Service ==
=== Public Service Medal (PSM) ===
Public Service Medal ribbon

State/ Territory	Recipient	Citation	Notes
Fed.	Maria Axarlis-Coulter	For outstanding public service in assisting the effective transition of migrants and refugees into the Australian community.	
Fed.	Paul Geoffrey Burnard	For outstanding public service in advancing Australia's foreign relations in the strategic, economic and security policy fields.	
Fed.	Michael Joseph Callaghan	For outstanding public service in the reform of the financial and superannuation sectors in Australia.	
Fed.	Mark Ernest Cuncliffe	For outstanding public service in the provision of high level legal advice in the Department of Defence, particularly in relation to Australian Defence Force deployments overseas and reform of the military justice system.	
Fed.	Jennifer Anne Granger	For outstanding public service in the administration of taxation in Australia and internationally, particularly in the area of compliance.	
Fed.	Louise Helen Hand	For outstanding public service as Deputy Head of Mission at the Australian Embassy in Jakarta in leading a whole-of-government approach to inter-agency work which has delivered significant outcomes for Australia and Indonesia.	
Fed.	Dr Thomas Joseph Hatton	For outstanding public service in leading ground breaking research into current and future water availability and management in Australia.	
Fed.	Vincent Joseph Lazzaro	For outstanding public service in extending and significantly improving the statistical information available for decision making in Australia.	
Fed.	Jacqueline Sue McRae	For outstanding public service in managing the planning, operational readiness and delivery phases of the Australia 2020 Summit and APEC 2007.	
Fed.	David Joseph Martinek	For outstanding public service in the field of aircraft corrosion control and management.	
Fed.	Nina Alexandrovna Mitropolskaya	For outstanding public service in facilitating trade and investment opportunities for Australian businesses in Russia and strengthening the Australia-Russia bilateral relationship.	
Fed.	Craig Andrew Storen	For outstanding public service as Chief Finance Officer in the Department of Education, Employment and Workplace Relations, particularly the implementation of significant financial and personnel changes and delivery of a complex budget package.	
Fed.	Alan Leslie Stray	For outstanding public service in improving aviation safety in Australia and Indonesia.	
Fed.	David John Tune	For outstanding public service in the development of significant economic and social policy reforms in a way that models whole-of-government service.	
Fed.	Raelene Susan Vivian	For outstanding public service in the development and implementation of significant reforms to the taxation arrangements governing superannuation.	
NSW	Susan Frazer Dixon	For outstanding public service in the development of consumer protection and social justice policy in New South Wales.	
NSW	Unis Yim-Wah Goh	For outstanding public service, particularly in the provision of community housing in New South Wales.	
NSW	Rodney Kevin Howard	For outstanding public service to Integral Energy Australia in New South Wales.	
NSW	Richard Paul Irving AM, RFD	For outstanding public service, particularly in the implementation of public sector reforms and productivity in New South Wales.	
NSW	Carole Anne McDiarmid	For outstanding public service to education in western New South Wales.	
NSW	Norman Stanley McLeod	For outstanding public service to local government in New South Wales.	
NSW	Rodney Dale Morrison	For outstanding public service, particularly in the development of enhanced safety measures within the mining industry in New South Wales.	
NSW	David Lindsay Nolan	For outstanding public service, particularly with the Roads and Traffic Authority of New South Wales.	
NSW	Robert Grenville Smith	For outstanding public service, particularly to the Office of State Revenue in New South Wales.	
NSW	Alan Travers	For outstanding public service to local government in the Penrith region.	
NSW	Joe Woodward	For outstanding public service, particularly in the protection of the New South Wales environment.	
VIC	Brian Francis Corney	For outstanding public service in promoting better relationships between employers and employees and in supporting Victoria's most vulnerable workers.	
VIC	Jillian Ann Howard	For outstanding public service, particularly towards the achievement of excellence in health planning and hospital design in Victoria.	
VIC	John Lolas	For outstanding public service in the development of consumer rights protection in Victoria and in establishing a standard of excellence in conciliation services.	
VIC	Claire Christine Thomas	For outstanding public service in the provision of advice on important economic, environmental and social policy issues affecting Victoria.	
VIC	Leo Van der Toorren	For outstanding public service in the development of the State Crisis Centre in Victoria and to national crisis centre capability.	
VIC	Thomas Franklin "Tom" Wills	For outstanding public service in enhancing the provision of justice services to regional Victoria.	
QLD	Gregory Kenneth "Greg" Claydon	For outstanding public service in the areas of natural resource management and water reform.	
QLD	Warren Edward Day	For outstanding public service in the fields of engineering and disaster management.	
QLD	David Joseph Kopelky	For outstanding public service to education in Queensland, particularly in the field of environmental education.	
QLD	Jennifer Mary Muller	For outstanding public service within Queensland Health, particularly in the areas of cancer screening programs and access to health services.	
QLD	John Patrick Strano	For outstanding public service in the areas of investment and trade.	
QLD	Dennis Stanley Wogan	For outstanding public service to the road design and construction industry.	
WA	Eric Henry Barker	For outstanding public service to the rock lobster industry in Western Australia.	
WA	Janice Marie Stewart	For outstanding public service as the chief executive officer of Lotterywest.	
SA	Julie Noreen Cann	For outstanding public service in the area of water licensing reform.	
SA	John Walter Page	For outstanding public service through the maintenance and development of road transport infrastructure in remote South Australia.	
SA	Marcia May Stewart	For outstanding public service in achieving positive outcomes for Public Trustee clients.	
ACT	Dianne Therese Ireland	For outstanding public service, particularly in the conduct of special events in the Australian Capital Territory.	
ACT	Kathleen Elizabeth "Kate" Jones	For outstanding public service, particularly in the field of child welfare psychology.	
ACT	Helen Pappas	For outstanding public service to the welfare of children in the Australian Capital Territory.	
NT	Kathleen Clayden	For outstanding public service, leadership and commitment to the Northern Territory Public Service.	
NT	John Glasby	For outstanding public service, particularly to public education in the Northern Territory.	

=== Australian Police Medal (APM) ===
Australian Police Medal ribbon

State/ Territory	Recipient	Notes
AFP	Assistant Commissioner Peter Thomas Drennan	
AFP	Federal Agent Jarrod Andrew Ragg	
AFP	Federal Agent Russel John Smith	
NSW	Detective Chief Inspector Graeme McLeod Abel	
NSW	Superintendent Ian Andrew Ball	
NSW	Superintendent Christopher Ronald Clark	
NSW	Superintendent Michael John Fuller	
NSW	Sergeant Brian Joseph Kenny	
NSW	Detective Chief Superintendent Jeffrey Allen Loy	
NSW	Detective Sergeant Janne Patricia McMahon	
NSW	Sergeant John Charles Marshall	
NSW	Senior Sergeant Christopher James Reardon	
VIC	Acting Senior Sergeant Peter Ronald Bellion	
VIC	Detective Inspector Stephen Clark	
VIC	Sergeant Gregory Glenn Faulkner	
VIC	Inspector Allan George Folvig	
VIC	Senior Sergeant Barry Raymond Gibson	
VIC	Detective Inspector Trevor David Wilson	
QLD	Inspector Joanne Mary Aitken	
QLD	Senior Sergeant Peter Bernard Banaghan	
QLD	Chief Superinendent Leslie Mervyn Hopkins	
QLD	Chief Superinendent Michael Joseph Keating	
QLD	Chief Superinendent Donald Anthony Wright	
WA	Superinendent Alfred Bernard Fordham	
WA	First Class Sergeant Peter Haldane Harbison	
WA	Inspector Lance Douglas Martin	
SA	Assistant Commissioner Anthony Gerard Harrison	
SA	Brevet Sergeant Peter Alan Lawrence	
SA	Senior Sergeant Ross Samuel Rhodes	
TAS	Commander Donna Louise Adams	
TAS	Commander Glenn Ronald Frame	
NT	Sergeant Stuart Axtell Davis	
NT	Detective Senior Sergeant Scott Alan Pollock	

=== Australian Fire Service Medal (AFSM) ===
Australian Fire Service Medal ribbon

State/ Territory	Recipient	Notes
NSW	Frederick Albert Apthorpe	
NSW	Stuart Wayne Bear	
NSW	Mark Maxwell Brown	
NSW	Bryan John Daly	
NSW	James Henry Drane	
NSW	Dennis Joiner	
NSW	Joseph Robert "Joe" Knox	
NSW	Stanley Ronald Reimer	
NSW	Alfred "John" Sendall	
NSW	Christopher John Smith	
VIC	Robert Lindsay Barry	
VIC	Bayden Bruce Biggs	
VIC	Thomas Joseph Brodie	
VIC	Gregory Alfred Esnouf	
VIC	Graham Parkes	
VIC	Garry Ronald Watson	
QLD	Edward Offord	
QLD	Grahame Lindsay Ray	
QLD	David Oliver Roser	
QLD	Bernard Paul Savage	
WA	Terry Matthew Little	
SA	Robert Samuel Buttery†	
SA	Wayne Brian Thorley	
TAS	Gerald Charles Aulich	
TAS	Garry Michael Sullivan	
TAS	Gregory Walter Williams	

=== Ambulance Service Medal (ASM) ===
Ambulance Service Medal ribbon

State/ Territory	Recipient	Notes
NSW	Jeffrey Lindsay Gilchrist	
NSW	Hendrik Kruit	
NSW	Norm Spalding	
NSW	Jennifer Van Cleef	
NSW	Garry Ross Vincent	
NSW	Jeffrey John Woods	
VIC	Alan Kenneth Eade	
VIC	Austin Richard Gapper	
VIC	Hector McLeod Stagg	
QLD	Christopher Mark Broomfield	
QLD	Terry Franz Zillmann	
QLD	Stephen Zsombok	
WA	Evelyn Ronaldine Brady	
WA	Michael James Jack	
WA	Brian McLuckie	
SA	Robert Keith Miller	
TAS	Peter William Berry	
TAS	Wayne Phillip Doran	
TAS	Paul Geoffrey Templar	

=== Emergency Service Medal (ESM) ===
Emergency Services Medal ribbon

State/ Territory	Recipient	Notes
NSW	Mark William Coulter	
NSW	Scott Hanckel	
NSW	Glenn William McMahon	
NSW	Kenneth Eric McManus	
NSW	Gregory John Snape	
NSW	Barry Gordon Swan RFD, ED	
NSW	Stacey Tannos	
VIC	Clive Anthony Radcliffe	
QLD	Warren George Bridson	
QLD	Terence John Ryan	
WA	Bernard Allan McNamara	
SA	William "Stuart" Lambert	
TAS	Toni McIntyre Brown	
TAS	Paul James Shipp	
NT	Selwyn Robert Kloeden	

== Gallantry, Distinguished and Conspicuous Service ==
=== Medal for Gallantry (MG) ===
Medal for Gallantry ribbon

Branch	Recipient	Citation	Notes
Navy	Petty Officer Benjamin James Sime	For gallantry in action in hazardous circumstances during a waterborne terrorist attack in the North Persian Gulf, Iraq, during Operation Catalyst.	
Army	Trooper S from the SAS	For acts of gallantry in action in hazardous circumstances in Afghanistan as part of the Special Operations Task Group during Operation Slipper, Oruzgan Province, Afghanistan.	

=== Distinguished Service Cross (DSC) ===
Distinguished Service Cross ribbon

Branch	Recipient	Citation	Notes
Army	Lieutenant Colonel Justin Frederick Ellwood	For distinguished command and leadership in action as the Commander of Rotation Three of the Overwatch Battle Group – West during Operation CATALYST.	
Army	Lieutenant Colonel David John Wainwright	For distinguished command and leadership in action as the Commanding Officer of the 3rd Reconstruction Task Force on Operation SLIPPER.	

=== Distinguished Service Medal (DSM) ===
Distinguished Service Medal ribbon

Branch	Recipient	Citation	Notes
Army	Major Michael Brodie Bassingthwaighte	For distinguished leadership in action as the Officer Commanding, Security Task Group and Combat Team Spear of the 3rd Reconstruction Task Force on Operation SLIPPER.	

=== Commendation for Distinguished Service ===
Commendation for Distinguished Service ribbon

Branch	Recipient	Citation	Notes
Army	Major Paul Brenton Foura	For distinguished performance of duties in warlike operations as the Officer Commanding the construction of Forward Operating Base LOCKE in Chora, southern Afghanistan, during Operation SLIPPER.	
Army	Major Kenneth Royston Martin	For distinguished performance of duties in warlike operations as the Executive Officer of the 3rd Reconstruction Task Force, Operation SLIPPER in Oruzgan Province, Afghanistan	
Army	Captain Scottie James Morris	For distinguished performance of duties in warlike operations as the Operations Officer and Officer in Command Deployable Exploitation Team, Task Force Troy, Iraq.	
Army	Warrant Officer Class Two Geoffrey Sidney Rowland	For distinguished performance of duties in warlike operations as the Squadron Sergeant Major of the Engineer Task Group and Senior Explosive Ordnance Disposal Technician with the 3rd Reconstruction Task Force on Operation SLIPPER.	
Army	Bombardier Noel Jonathan Toms	For distinguished performance of duties in warlike operations as a Joint Terminal Attack Controller, 3rd Reconstruction Task Force on Operation SLIPPER.	
Air Force	Wing Commander William Kourelakos CSM	For distinguished performance of duties in warlike operations as the Commander, Task Group 633.4 on Operation SLIPPER and Operation CATALYST at Al Udeid Airbase, Qatar.	

=== Conspicuous Service Cross (CSC) ===
Conspicuous Service Cross ribbon

Branch	Recipient	Citation	Notes
Navy	Chief Petty Officer Marc Henderson	For outstanding achievement as the Chief Petty Officer Promotions in the Directorate of Sailors’ Career Management.	
Navy	Lieutenant Commander Adrian Joseph Lister RAN	For outstanding achievement as the Senior Military Recruiting Officer, Defence Force Recruiting Centre – NSW.	
Navy	Commander Niel Joseph Wark RAN	For outstanding achievement as the Fleet Environmental and Occupational Health and Safety Coordinating Officer.	
Army	Colonel Stephen Anthony Coggin	For outstanding achievement as the Commander of Combined Task Force 635 Rotation 14.	
Army	Major Leon Helmrich	For outstanding achievement in the development of small arms training, weapon safety and policy in the Australian Defence Force.	
Army	Lieutenant Colonel Stephanie Elizabeth Hodson	For outstanding achievement as the Commanding Officer of the 1st Psychology Unit.	
Army	Lieutenant Colonel Wally John Jensen	For outstanding achievement as Commanding Officer of the 41st Battalion, Royal New South Wales Regiment.	
Army	Warrant Officer Class One Richard Brian Lovelock	For outstanding achievement as Army's Soldier Recruit Induction Manager.	
Army	Brigadier Patrick Pezzuti RFD	For outstanding achievement as a specialist anaesthetist and adviser to the Defence Health Services Division.	
Army	Colonel Janet Fiona Scott	For outstanding achievement as the Commanding Officer of the 3rd Health Support Battalion and as the senior Dental Officer in South Australia.	
Army	Colonel Wesley David Volant	For outstanding achievement as the Commander Combat Training Centre from 2006 to 2008 and Commanding Officer/Chief Instructor of Combat Training Centre (Live) from 2005 to 2006.	
Army	Colonel Anthony George Wallace	For outstanding achievement as the Director Workforce Modelling, Forecasting and Analysis within the People Strategies and Policy Group.	
Air Force	Sergeant Barry Damsma	For outstanding achievement as an aircraft technician at Number 285 Squadron.	
Air Force	Flight Sergeant Adam Gegenhuber	For outstanding achievement as an Avionics Systems Technician at Number 77 Squadron.	
Air Force	Wing Commander Michelle Therese Heading	For outstanding achievement as the Executive Officer of the Australian Defence Force Counter Improvised Explosive Device Task Force.	
Air Force	Wing Commander Jason William Waller	For outstanding achievement as Commanding Officer of Number 2 Flying Training School.	

=== Conspicuous Service Medal (CSM) ===
Conspicuous Service Medal ribbon

Branch	Recipient	Citation	Notes
Navy	Lieutenant Debra Jane Neil RAN	For meritorious achievement as the Course Implementation Officer, Royal Australian Navy Recruit School.	
Navy	Lieutenant Duncan John Perryman RANR	For meritorious achievement as the Royal Australian Navy Senior Naval Historical Officer.	
Navy	Chief Petty Officer Paul Ernest Phillips	For meritorious achievement as the senior electrical sailor onboard HMAS Anzac.	
Navy	Lieutenant Commander Fraser Anderssen Vergelius	For devotion to duty as the Submarine Plans Officer, Fleet Headquarters.	
Navy	Chief Petty Officer Jeremy Michael Wade	For meritorious achievement in optimising the materiel state and personnel training as a Marine Technician onboard HMAS Warramunga.	
Navy	Chaplain Graeme Maxwell Watkinson RAN	For devotion to duty as the Senior Chaplain Training at HMAS Cerberus, particularly towards the introduction of the Lifeskilling and Alpha programs into the Royal Australian Navy.	
Army	Warrant Officer Class Two Glenn David Armstrong	For meritorious achievement as Squadron Sergeant Major at the Australian Defence Force Academy.	
Army	Captain Michael Robert Blazely	For meritorious achievement as the Logistics Officer, Rotation 12, Combined Task Force 635, Solomon Islands, between April and August 2007.	
Army	Warrant Officer Class One David Graeme Brown	For meritorious achievement as the Chief Clerk of the Headquarters 3rd Brigade in support of operational readiness for deployment to Timor Leste in 2006.	
Army	Warrant Officer Class Two Joanne Pamela Cripps	For meritorious achievement as the Company Sergeant Major, Administration Company, the 7th Combat Services Support Battalion.	
Army	Warrant Officer Class Two Donald Edward Gilson	For devotion to duty as the Warrant Officer Operations for Joint Operations Support Staff, New South Wales.	
Army	Sergeant Eliot Barlow Kruger	For meritorious achievement as Interface Sergeant and Manager of Telecommunications Systems within the Defence Communications Station Melbourne.	
Army	Major Ronaldo Zalamea Manahan	For devotion to duty as a Staff Officer Grade 2 Training Plans at Headquarters Training Command – Army.	
Army	Warrant Officer Class Two David Charlesb Oliver	For meritorious achievement as the All Source Intelligence Facility Commander, 3rd Reconstruction Task Force on Operation SLIPPER.	
Army	Private Michael Anthony Rayner	For devotion to duty as the Operator Supply of the 110th Air Defence Battery, the 16th Air Defence Regiment.	
Army	Warrant Officer Class Two Dale Bradley Wallace	For devotion to duty as the Training Warrant Officer, Regimental Headquarters, 1st/15th Royal New South Wales Lancers.	
Air Force	Corporal Robert John Bedggood	For meritorious achievement as the Non-Commissioned Officer-in-Charge of Delamere Air Weapons Range, Number 44 Wing Detachment Tindal.	
Air Force	Warrant Officer Wayne Thomas Milligan	For meritorious achievement as an Airworthiness Flight Systems Engineer at Air Movements Training and Development Unit.	
Air Force	Wing Commander Sarah Jane Pearson	For meritorious achievement in support of air combat capability as the Commanding Officer of the Strike Reconnaissance Logistics Management Unit.	
Air Force	Corporal David Gerald Rayfield	For meritorious achievement as the General Support Equipment Fitter at Royal Australian Air Force Base Scherger.	
United States Air Force	Major Lee Campbell Guthrie	For meritorious achievement as the C-17A Globemaster United States Air Force exchange officer and the Standards and Role Qualification Flight Commander at Number 36 Squadron.	
