= Bernard Teague =

Australian judge

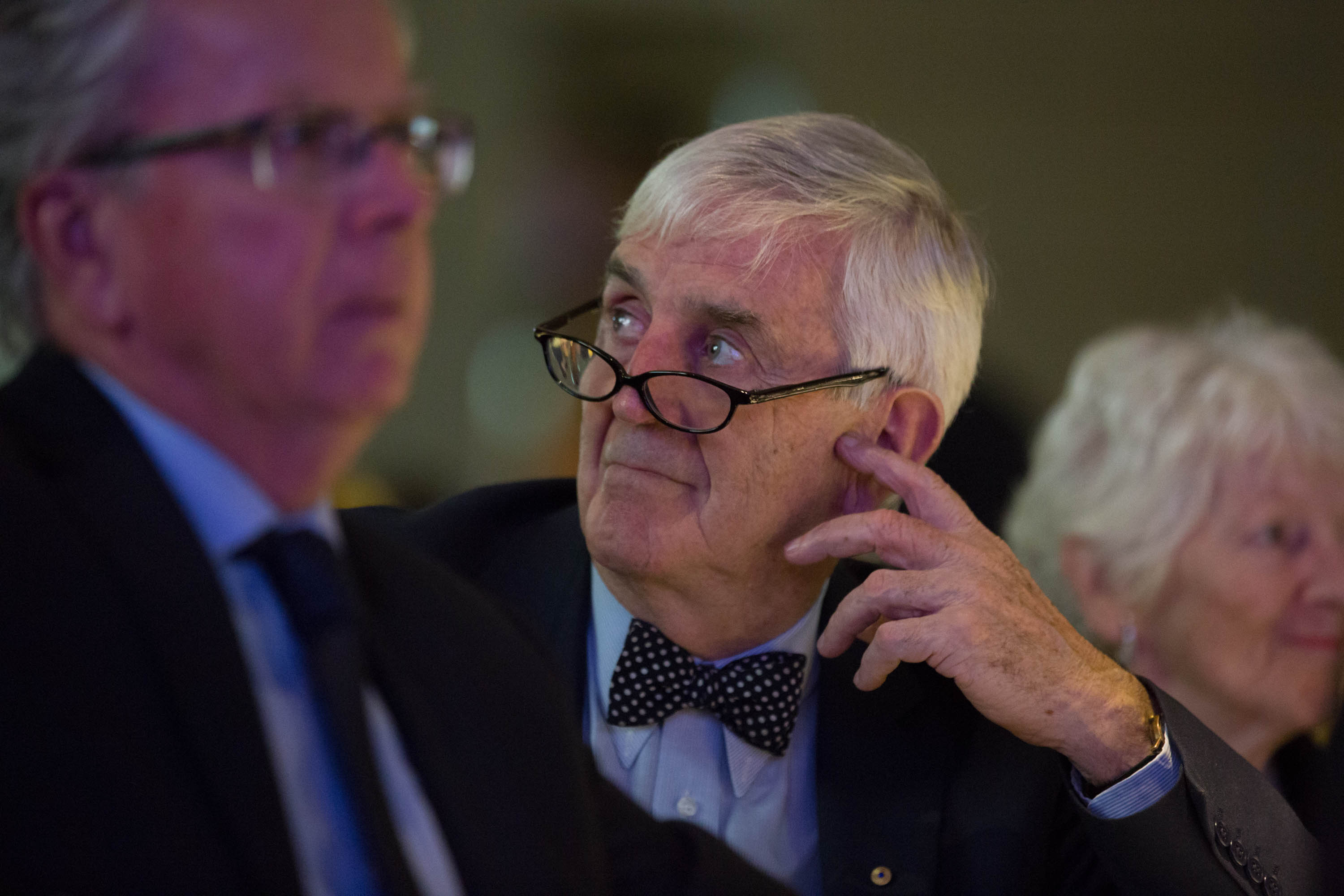
- Teague at the Melbourne Press Club Quill Awards, March 2017.

Judge of the Supreme Court of Victoria
- In office 13 October 1987 – 15 February 2008

Bernard George Teague, AO, was a Judge of the Supreme Court of Victoria, in Australia, between 13 October 1987 and 15 February 2008.

== Education ==
Teague was educated at De La Salle College, Malvern and then at the University of Melbourne, where he graduated with a Bachelor of Arts in 1960 and a Bachelor of Laws with honours in 1962.

== Career ==
Teague was appointed Justice of the Supreme Court of Victoria on 13 October 1987, the first solicitor (i.e., non-barrister) to be so appointed. Previously, he had been chief litigation solicitor for the Melbourne law firm, Corrs, and President of the Law Institute of Victoria. He was created an Officer of the Order of Australia in the 2009 Australia Day Honours "for service to the law, particularly through leadership roles with the Law Institute of Victoria, the Parole Board of Victoria and Forensicare, to the judiciary through the development of innovative courtroom practices, and to the community."

On 13 February 2009, Teague was appointed to head the Bushfires Royal Commission on the Black Saturday bushfires.

In February 2014 he was appointed to head an inquiry into the Hazelwood coal mine fires, which resulted in a lengthy suppression effort while creating a major environmental hazard from the smoke which hung over the Latrobe Valley, particularly Morwell, for some four weeks. Public hearings into the fire began on 26 May 2014.
