= Alison Mackinnon =

Australian historian

Alison Mackinnon AM FASSA (born 1942 Shepparton Victoria) as Alison Gay Madin (Maiden) was a social historian who contributed to both Australian and women's history. Particular areas of expertise were the history of education, women's social and demographic history, the history and politics of population change, population ageing, and work and responsibility changes wrought by globalisation.

Mackinnon graduated from the University of Melbourne with a BA and DipEd before moving to the University of Adelaide where she completed a MA and PhD.

She was appointed Professor of History and Gender Studies at the University of South Australia in 1997, and was the Foundation Director of the Hawke Research Institute from 1997 to December 2005. Mackinnon was a Board Member of the History Trust of South Australia from 2004 to 2013 and was President of the History Council of South Australia from 2005-2008. In 2014 she was appointed to the Heritage Council of South Australia.

Mackinnon was elected a Fellow of the Academy of the Social Science in Australia in 2005. In the 2009 Australia Day Honours she was appointed a Member of the Order of Australia for "service to education, particularly in the fields of social research and development, as an academic and author, and to the community through roles with history organisations".

She died at home in Unley Park, South Australia, on 22 April 2025.

== Selected publications ==
- Women, Love and Learning: The Double Bind (2010)
- Hope: The Everyday and Imaginary Life of Young People on the Margins, with Simon Robb, Patrick O'Leary and Peter Bishop (2010)
- Love and Freedom (1997) (awarded a New South Wales Premier's Literary Award)
- The New Women: Adelaide's Early Women Graduates (1986)

=== Books edited ===
- The Hawke Legacy: Towards a Sustainable Society, with Gerry Bloustien and Barbara Comber (2009)
- Fresh Water: New Perspectives on Water in Australia, with Stephen McKenzie and Jennifer McKay (2007)
- Gender and the Restructured University, with Ann Brooks (2001)
- Gender and Institutions: Welfare, Work and Citizenship, Moira Gatens (1998)
- Education into the 21st Century, with Alison MacKinnon, Inga Elgqvist-Saltzman and Alison Prentice (1998)
