= Bill Casimaty =

Australian farmer and agriculturalist (1935–2019)

Bill Gabriel Casimaty AM (21 August 1935 – 6 July 2019) was an Australian farmer and agriculturalist.

Casimaty studied at Dookie Agricultural College and in 1957 took over management of his family's farm in Richmond, Tasmania. In 1966 he won a Nuffield Farming Scholarship, which he used to investigate turf farming in the United States. On his return, he established Strathayr Turf, which would go on to supply the Melbourne Cricket Ground, Flemington Racecourse, and Lord's, among others.

In the 2009 Australia Day Honours Casimaty was made a Member of the Order of Australia (AM) for "service to the horticultural industry through the development and implementation of innovative turf construction and management practices and through the development of irrigation schemes, to viticulture, and to the community".
