= 2009 Victorian Bushfires Royal Commission =

Australian commission of enquiry, 2009–2010

- Outcome: 67 Recommendations in Final Report; 7 Recommendations in 2nd Interim Report; 51 Recommendations in the 1st Interim Report
- Commissioners: Bernard Teague; Susan Pascoe; Ronald McLeod
- Inquiry period: 16 February 2009 – 31 July 2010
- Website: Archived at Trove - Snapshot as at 27 September 2010

The 2009 Victorian Bushfires Royal Commission was a Victorian royal commission that concluded on 31 July 2010 that investigated the circumstances surrounding the Black Saturday bushfires on Saturday 7 February 2009 which caused 173 fatalities.

== Preceding events ==
Premier John Brumby announced a Royal Commission into the fires to examine "all aspects of the government's bushfire strategy", including whether climate change contributed to the severity of the fires.

On 13 February 2009 Brumby announced that Justice Bernard Teague, former judge of the Supreme Court of Victoria, would chair the Commission, to be assisted by two other Commissioners. On 16 February, the assistant Commissioners were appointed: Ron McLeod, former Commonwealth Ombudsman and the head of an inquiry concerning the 2003 Canberra bushfires; and Susan Pascoe, the Commissioner of the State Services Authority. The Commission was given very broad terms of reference, with Premier Brumby saying that the Commission would be "[t]he most open inquiry that is possible. No stone unturned. Every bit of information on the table. And if that means calling ministers or premiers, or whoever it is, we will be happy to assist."

== The commission ==
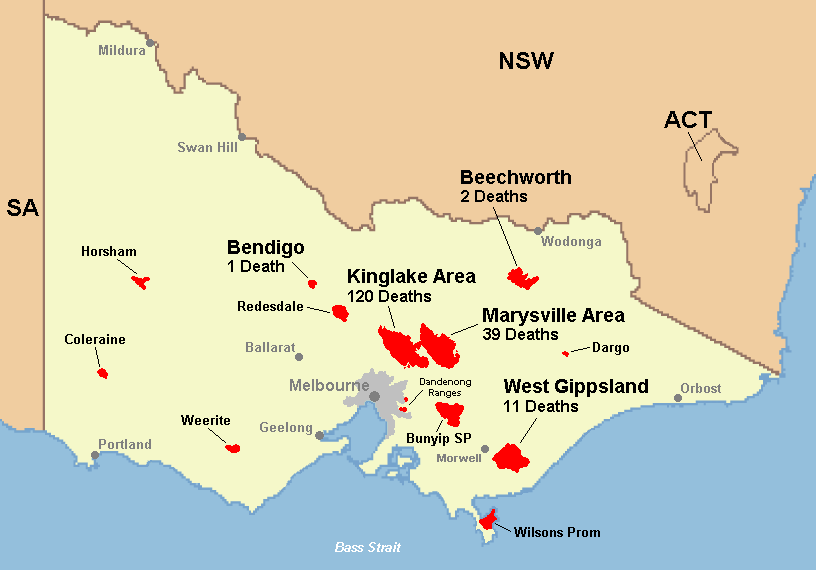
A map of the fire events and fatalities on 7 February 2009 that were the main focus of the Royal Commission

In the preliminary hearing on 20 April, commission counsel Jack Rush delivered in his opening address that an interim report assessing the inadequately short notice warnings would be delivered by the commission to the government by August. The report would evaluate the current "stay or go policy" for bushfire evacuation, and during the commission various bureaucrats' performance and judgment was scrutinised, including Commissioner of Emergency Services Bruce Esplin, and CFA Operations Officer Jason Lawrence but most significantly CFA Chief Officer Russel Rees. Rees's knowledge and the rapidity of his actions (mainly lack of) were questioned, and his defense included: that 7 February was the first day the Integrated Emergency Coordination Centre (IECC) had been tested and it worked well; that intelligence was unclear during the day; that the IECC were very busy; the fires were being fought from the inside and not the outside; and that he couldn't focus on one fire because it would narrow his statewide perspective. The commission's questioning explicitly revealed that Rees had not kept close contact with the progress of the Kilmore East fire. At 4pm, ten minutes before the Strathewen fires had consumed the area, Rees had accepted a state situation report claiming the fire remained in Mount Disappointment's forest and wouldn't reach Whittlesea for five hours, 30 minutes later the Kilmore East fire reached Kinglake West and swarmed Kinglake less than three hours later. News of deaths reached the Kangaroo Ground CFA office at 5pm and Rees said he'd first been informed of these deaths between 7 and 8pm. Rees was also unaware: of the aircraft line-scan taken after the fire erupted, chief fire behaviour expert Dr Kevin Tolhurst's presence and predictive map he and his team produced. Rees's evidence explained that warnings weren't issued from the centre but from the periphery, the local incident-control centers (ICCs), the IECC's only responsibility was to place such warnings on the CFA website, but nor Rees or any IECC members saw the warnings.

The working bushfire 'stay or go' (evacuate or protect your home) policy was scrutinised and severely questioned. The policy was founded on the empirical claim, researched by Dr Katherine Haynes, that concluded that survival was more likely for people to be actively fighting the fire at home than passively shelter or evacuate to be stuck on the roads. The policy was defended by Esplin, who argued against the proposal of compulsory mass evacuation insisting that people intending to leave their homes should have been gone long before specific fires were imminent. He clarified that threat messages weren't a signal to evacuate but exclusive prompts to assist people who planned to defend their property. Robert Manne adds "In the philosophy of Bruce Esplin ... the kind of mid-afternoon warnings the citizens north of Melbourne so desperately needed on 7 February simply had no place".

In its final week, the commission looked at the fuel-reduction burns in Bendigo and Gippsland. As it turned out, none of the 51 recommendations the commission handed down dealt with fuel reduction, but there was significant public concern that something more should have been done.

=== Criticism of the stay or go policy ===
Manne drew his own conclusions based on the evidence heard at the Royal Commission: "From the evidence collected at the royal commission, the cumbersome new bureaucratic machine, the IECC, seems to have operated like an army without a general, where no one thought it their responsibility to take the lead.

"Because of the false empirical assumptions of the stay-or-go policy, many of those at the IECC seem to have convinced themselves that if last-minute warnings triggered flight, this would pose a deadlier threat than staying put.

"Far too few inside the firefighting bureaucracies were willing on 7 February to break the rules, to disobey authority or to act spontaneously at time of crisis". The interim report was released to the public on 17 August.

=== Criticism of the fuel-reduction burns ===
In a guest editorial for Australian Forestry, Michael Ryan, one of the victims who lost houses in Bendigo and who works in forestry, said that Victorian authorities need to "manage fuels appropriately in diverse forest types, and residents at the rural-urban interface need to be properly prepared—and on 7 February the reality is that many were not."
