= Fusion International =

Fusion International is a cooperative of like-minded Christian youth and community centres in various countries around the world committed to the same values, principles and vision. Its vision statement is "Bringing young people and communities together with hope".

Fusion was originally started in Australia in the early 1960s to help meet the needs of dis-enfranchised young people. Fusion was founded in Australia by Mal Garvin, who retired in 2009 following allegations of sexual misconduct. As a largely volunteer organisation, it broadened its focus in the 1990s to various community needs and at one stage had over 30 centres around Australia. There are currently 15 centres around Australia. In 2003 it began its first centres outside of Australia, with work in England and then Greece. There are now groups of people undertaking Fusion's work in over 15 countries. These include Albania, Canada, England, Ghana, Greece, Nigeria, Poland, South Africa, India, Nepal, Indonesia and Jamaica. Representatives from these different works meet together annually under the umbrella of Fusion International to support and encourage the development of this work.

== Teams and centres ==
Fusion's services focus on community building, finding a sense of purpose and a Christian values base. Fusion's centres are established in response to research of local needs. In Australia this has led Fusion into outreach and support services such as drop-in centres and youth cafes, lunchtime programs in schools, accommodation and dwelling programs for youth and families, arts and crafts and social activities for isolated women, parenting programs for young single parents, mentoring and other special programs for teenagers who are not fitting into the school system, employment training schemes, outdoor education programs, community festivals designed to build connection in fragmented towns and suburbs, vocational rehabilitation, radio and print media and contributing to social policy development and action.

== Training programs ==
Fusion Australia Ltd was a registered training organisation, providing nationally accredited training within the Australian Qualifications Framework. Fusion ran a Certificate IV in Youth and Community Work (Christian).

Fusion also trains educators to work in both first world and developing countries, developing community development skills to equip communities to be healthier. The intention of the community development programs is to work with local nationals and volunteers. The programs are designed to be transferable, reproducible and self-sustaining.
