= Graham Toulmin =

Graham Adrian Toulmin, AM FICD (born 31 March 1948) is a dentist and musician, notable for his fundraising and dental philanthropy for the Democratic Republic of Congo. In 2009, Toulmin was made a member of the Order of Australia.

== Life and work in Zaïre: 1987-1991 ==
Toulmin trained as a missionary in 1985, and in 1987 moved with his family to the Democratic Republic of the Congo with the Church Missionary Society where he and his wife established a small dental clinic in Butembo. He travelled to outlying villages offering dental services and commenced training nurses in dental procedures; these nurse eventually took over the work from him. After being evacuated twice because of instability in the eastern regions of Zaire, Toulmin and his family returned to Australia in 1991.

Toulmin's wrote of his family of six leaving Australia and going to the town of Butembo in the mountainous region of eastern Zaïre in his autobiography Long Road to Zaire.

== Fundraising and advocacy 1992-present ==
After returning to Australia in 1991, Toulmin began to raise funds and awareness for the war plagued country of Zaire. A trumpet player, Toulmin founded an organisation with his wife Wendy Toulmin called, ‘Brass for Africa’ (money for Africa) which over the next 14 years built a maternity clinic, established another dental clinic in Aru (some 600 km to the north of the original clinic), provided care and support for 34 Anglican clergy, helped build schools, supported AIDS orphans, and provided food and medical supplies for the increasing number of refugees fleeing the civil war. They accomplished this by making CDs, giving Jazz concerts and sponsoring Congolese nationals to visit Australia to make more widely known the plight of the Congolese people. Over 20,000 CDs were sold, and the entrepreneurial work still continued for many years even though ‘Brass for Africa’ wound down in 2007 and administration was transferred to an arm of Anglican Churches Springwood (NSW).

Toulmin has led teams of dental students on fact finding trips to DRC in 2009, 2010, 2011 and 2012. Toulmin continues to work with Anglican Aid and other agencies, to secure funding and provide support to the DRC

In 2015 Graham and Wendy Toulmin returned to Aru in the north east of the Democratic Republic of Congo, where Graham is the Director of Dental Training at the Institut Supérieur des Techniques Médicales (ISTM)

== Order of Australia ==
Graham Toulmin and his wife Wendy Toulmin were made members of the Order of Australia in the 2009 Australia Day Honours.

== Music ==
Toulmin has played trumpet for over 50 years. He performs improvised jazz and plays with his local band and orchestra.

== Published works ==
- Long road to Zaïre (2022, Ark House; ISBN 9780645286090 )
