= Wendy Toulmin =

Australian missionary

Wendy Alison Toulmin AM (née Stirling, born 5 January 1953) is a Christian philanthropist, former Executive Officer of Langham Partnership Australia and missionary in the Democratic Republic of the Congo. In 2009, Wendy Toulmin was made a member of the Order of Australia.

== Life and work in Zaire: 1987–1991 ==
Toulmin trained as a missionary in 1985, and in 1987 moved with her family to the Democratic Republic of the Congo with the Church Missionary Society where she and her husband established a small dental clinic in Butembo. She undertook language studies, assisted with literacy classes for the women, and raised four sons.

After being evacuated twice because of instability in the eastern regions of Zaire, Toulmin and her family returned to Australia in 1991.

== Fundraising and advocacy 1992–present ==
After returning to Australia in 1991, Toulmin and her husband began to raise funds and awareness for the war plagued country of Zaire. Toulmin founded an organisation with her husband Graham Toulmin called, ‘Brass for Africa’ (money for Africa) which over the next 14 years built the "Rafiki Australië maternity clinic", established another dental clinic in Aru, provided care and support for 34 Anglican clergy, helped build schools, supported AIDS orphans, and provided food and medical supplies for the increasing number of refugees fleeing the civil war. They accomplished this by making CDs, giving Jazz concerts and sponsoring Congolese nationals to visit Australia to make more widely known the plight of the Congolese people. Over 20,000 CDs were sold, and the entrepreneurial work still continues even though ‘Brass for Africa’ wound down in 2007 and administration was transferred to an arm of Anglican Churches Springwood (NSW). M Toulmin continues to work with Anglican Aid and other agencies, to secure funding and provide support to the Democratic Republic of the Congo.

In 2015 Wendy and Graham Toulmin returned to Aru in the north east of the Democratic Republic of Congo, where Wendy works in training and administration at the Institut Supérieur des Techniques Médicales (ISTM)

== Work with Langham Partnership Australia ==
Toulmin was involved in establishing Langham Trust Australia in 1980-1981 to fund scholarships for young evangelical leaders from the Majority World. In 2001 the Trust was restructured as Langham Partnership Australia, the Australian arm of Langham Partnership International, and Toulmin served as the Executive Officer from 2001 until 2014. Under her leadership, Langham Partnership Australia contributed to training programmes with church leaders across the Pacific region; scholarships for theological study in Australia; and literature production in languages of South East Asia, South Asia, the Pacific and the Middle East. Toulmin promoted the work of Langham Partnership Australia through regular newsletters, articles and speaking tours.

== Order of Australia ==
Wendy Toulmin and her husband Graham Toulmin were made members of the Order of Australia in the 2009 Australia Day Honours.

== Musical Talent ==
Toulmin has organised, conducted and sung in music programs for more than 30 years, including two live album recordings. She organised the performance of the Opera Orchestra and a 700-voice mass choir at the Sydney Opera House for the BBC's Songs of Praise program filmed for the Sydney 2000 Olympic Games.
