= Karen Iles =

Australian lawyer

Karen Margaret Iles
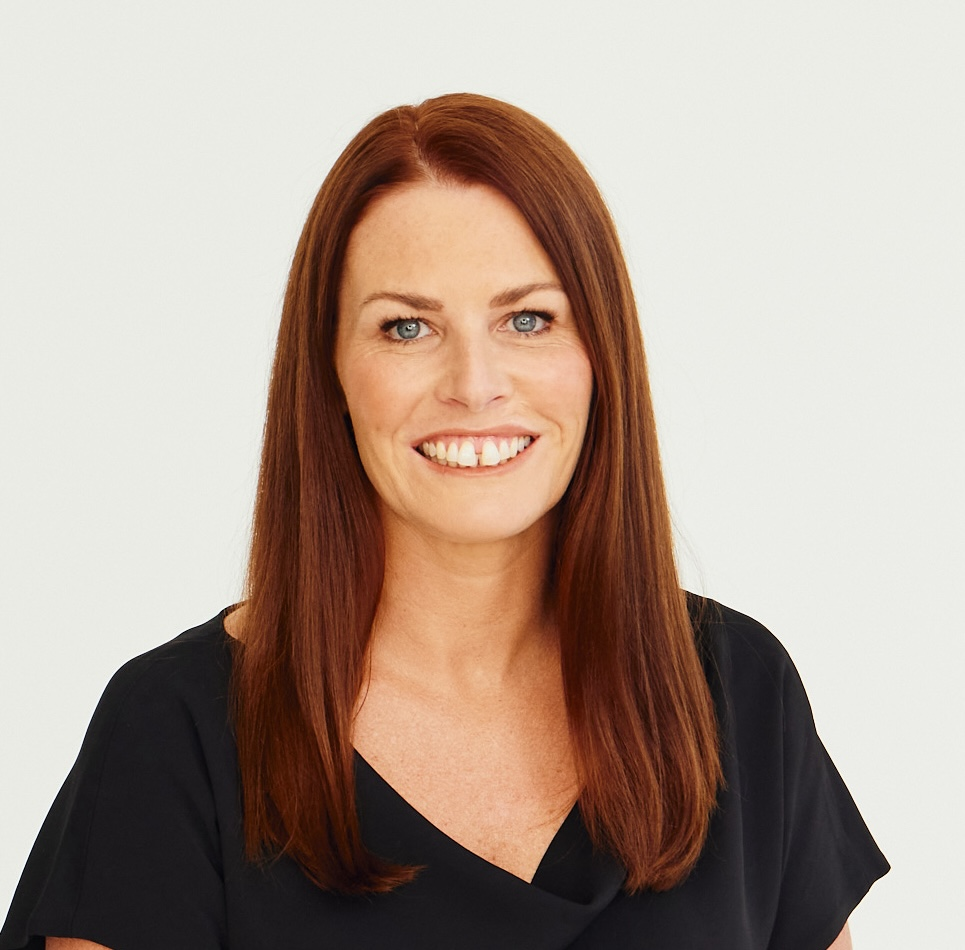
- Born: 1979 (age 46–47); Gosford, Central Coast, NSW, Australia
- Education: Macquarie University, University of Technology Sydney and College of Law Australia
- Occupation: Lawyer
- Known for: Women’s rights advocate

Karen Iles (born 1979) is an Australian lawyer specialising in employment and human rights law. She has a particular focus on employment and legal issues relating to women and First Nations people, sexual harassment and sexual assault. Iles opened her own legal practice Violet Co Legal & Consulting in 2019 - she is the Director and Principal Solicitor.

== Early life and education ==
Iles earned her Bachelor of Arts (Women’s Studies) at Macquarie University Sydney where she served two terms as the elected Women’s Officer in 1999 and 2000. Iles earned her Bachelor of Laws at the University of Technology Sydney and Post-Graduate Certificate Applied Law (Dispute Resolution) at the College of Law Australia. Iles is a Graduate of the Australian Institute of Company Directors. Iles is an Alumni Ambassador for the University of Technology Sydney.

== Professional career ==
Iles began her career in employment and Industrial Relations working for two Trade Unions. Iles was part of the founding group of the Labor4Refugees campaign to enshrine a human rights based policy for refugees and asylum seekers in the Australian Labor Party. She was featured in a Daily Telegraph article in 2002 as the “future of the Australian Labor Party”.

Her work as the Co-Director of Campaigns at Aid/Watch working for the rights of Traditional Indigenous Land Owners in Papua New Guinea was featured by ABC Radio in a long form documentary “Come to my Village: Land and Life in PNG”. While Co-Director of Aid/Watch Iles initiated litigation resulting in the precedent setting High Court Case for charity law in Australia.

Iles worked as the National Activism Manager at Amnesty International Australia before shifting focus to the corporate sector working in a range of Corporate Social Responsibility and Pro Bono leadership roles for multinational and Australian companies.

Iles opened her own legal practice, Violet Co Legal and Consulting in 2019. Iles is known for her expertise in employment law - particularly in relation to sexual harassment, sexual assault and other gender equality issues.

== Professional appointments ==
Commonwealth appointments

- Director, Our Watch Limited (2023 - current)
- Expert Advisory Group, Australian Law Reform Commission into Justice System Responses to Sexual Violence (2024 - current)
- National round-table on justice responses to sexual violence (2023)

Expert legal panel appointments

- Independent solicitor member of the National Review and Appeals Panel (sexual assault) for Australian Catholic Safeguarding (2022 - current)

Non Executive Director appointments - current

- First Australians Capital (2022 - current)
- The National Justice Project (2022 - current) - Deputy Chair
- Deadly Hearts Limited (2023 - current)

Other Advisory Board appointments - current

- Sydney Women’s Fund (2023 - current)
- National Women's Safety Alliance (2022 - current)

== Recognition ==
- Government of NSW, Finalist Woman of the Year Award (2025)
- Women Lawyers Association of NSW Private Practitioner of the Year (2023)
- Women Lawyers Association of NSW Finalist Woman Lawyer of the Year (2023)
- Law Society of NSW Pro Bono Service Award (2022)

== Personal life ==
Iles identifies as a Dharug Aboriginal woman with family connections to Gunanday (Rainbow River - the Lower MacDonald River). She was born and raised on Darkinjung Country (NSW Central Coast, Australia).

As a child Iles was victim of rape and sexual assault by a notorious gang. She speaks publicly about the crimes in order to drive reform to the legal and justice system and to inspire social change.

Iles is married and lives on Gadigal Land, Sydney Australia.

== Professional speaking and publications ==
Iles is represented by Speaking Out Agency She was a speaker at two events at the Sydney Opera House All About Women Festival

l (2023). Iles is the General Editor of the First Nations Law Bulletin for Lexis Nexis.

== Sexual assault law reform advocacy ==
Iles is the founder of the Make Police Investigate campaign, which calls for changes to the way sexual assault cases are investigated in Australia. The campaign is calling for:

- A duty of care owed by police to victim/survivors to ensure that the investigation process does not further re-traumatise victim/survivors
- A minimum set of investigatory requirements to provide victim/survivors, and police, with predictability and certainty
- Independent police accountability mechanisms
- Independent lawyers for victim/survivors
- Changes to the victims’ support schemes to better assist victim/survivors to heal and recover

The campaign has been featured in the media, including in The Guardian, ABC News, Channel 9 A Current Affair, Channel 10 The Project, other national and regional media and various podcasts.

Iles gave evidence to the Federal Inquiry into Current and Proposed Sexual Consent Laws 2023.

== Missing and murdered First Nations women and children advocacy ==
Iles advocates for the rights of families of missing and murdered First Nations women and children. She was called to give evidence at the Federal Inquiry into Missing and Murdered First Nations Women & Children (2022-2024).
