= Law Society of New South Wales =

Representative and regulatory association of solicitors in Australia

- Formation: 1842 (formally 1884)
- Location: New South Wales, Australia
- Official language: English
- Key people: Brett McGrath, President Kenneth Tickle, CEO
- Website: www.lawsociety.com.au

The Law Society of New South Wales is a professional association which represents over 42,000 solicitors in Australia. The Law Society has statutory powers and regulates the practice of law in New South Wales.

The Law Society of NSW encourages debate and actively drives law reform issues through policy submissions and open dialogue with governments, parliamentary bodies, the courts and the New South Wales Department of Justice. It ensures the general public has appropriate access to justice and can be easily connected to members of the profession when they require legal advice.

Along with the Office of the Legal Services Commissioner, the Law Society sets and enforces professional standards, licenses solicitors to practise, investigates complaints and administers discipline to ensure both the community and the profession are properly served by ethical and responsible solicitors.

The coat of arms of the Law Society of NSW

== History ==
The Law Society was informally started in 1842. In 1884, the society was formalized as "The Incorporated Law Institute of New South Wales", and had its first annual meeting the following year.

In 1960, the institute was renamed to "The Law Society of New South Wales". In 1963, the Society started publishing The Law Society Journal. The society also established the College of Law in 1973, the Legal Practitioners Act 1987 (NSW), Law Industry Superannuation Trust (LIST) and LawCare in 1989, and the Office of the Legal Services Commissioner in 1992. Vis-a-vis the Office of the Legal Services Commissioner (OLSC), alternatively, according to a 1994 leaflet from the OLSC, the OLSC was set up by the NSW government not the Law Society, and in July 1994 not 1992, by way of an amendment to the Legal Profession Act 1987, in particular Part 10. The 1987 Act was repealed in 2005 and replaced with the Legal Profession Act 2004 - in particular see Part 7.3.

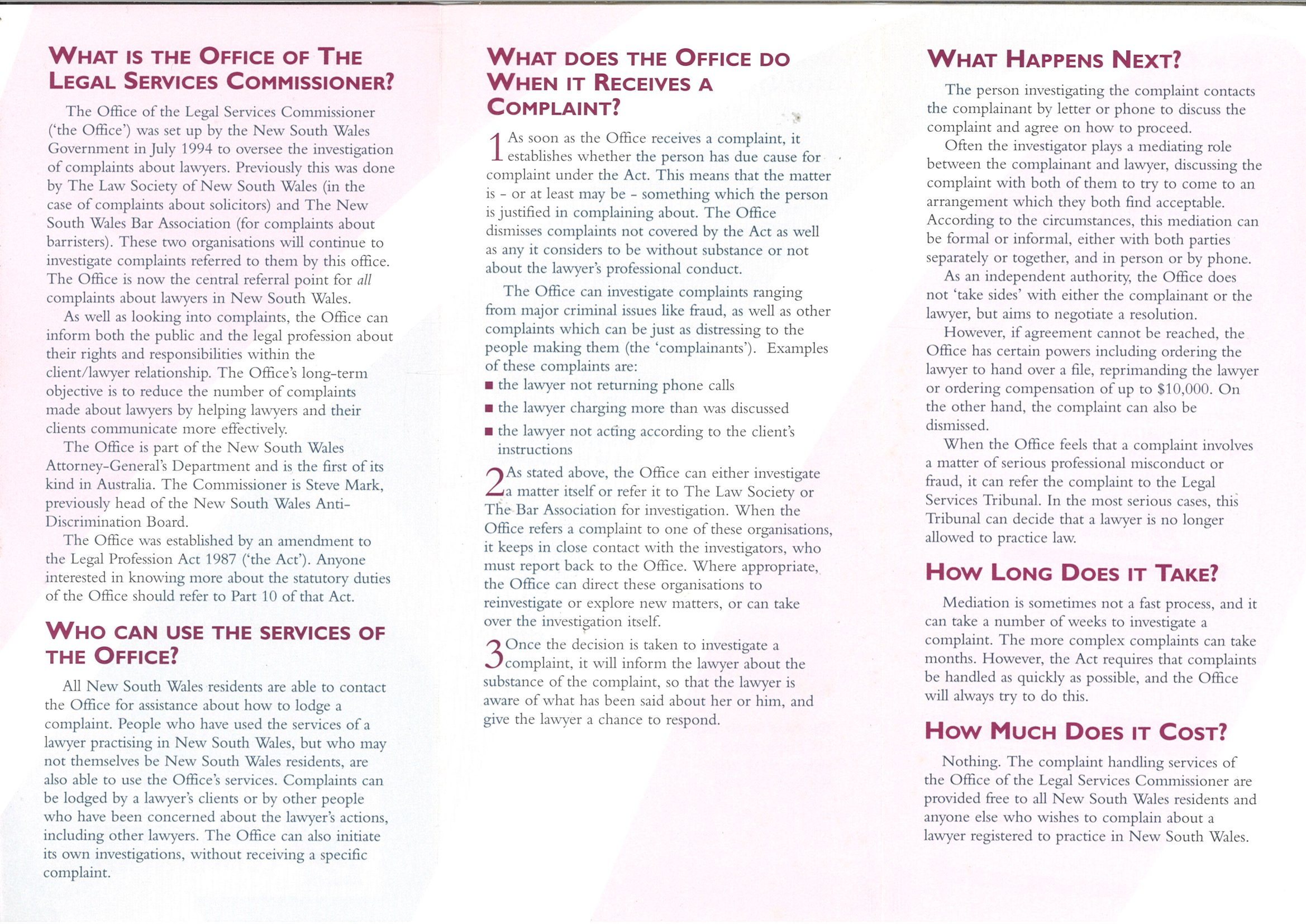
The origins of the Office of the Legal Services Commissioner

== List of presidents ==
Year	Name	Employer
1884–1891	John Williams	NSW Crown Solicitor
1892–1908	William Pigott	
1909–11	F Curtiss	
1912–14	EA Smith	
1915–17	HCE Rich	
1918–20	AM Hemsley	
1921–23	AC Stephen	
1924–26	DW Roxburgh	
1927–29	MAH Fitzhardinge	
1930–32	AN Littlejohn	
1933–35	JE Gosling	
1936	APN Dalrymple	
1937–39	WG Forsyth	
1940	JW Stevenson	
1941–43	WJ Baldock	
1944–45	JG Crowther	
1946	D Barron	
1947–49	Arthur E. Abbott	Parner, Garland Seaborn & Abbott
1950	GA Yuill	
1951–52	RZ de Ferranti	
1953–54	WER Francis	
1955–56	LW Taylor	
1957–58	TGD Marshall	
1959	NL Cowper	
1960–61	John Watling	Partner, Sly & Russell
1962–63	K Smithers	
1964–65	BJ McDonald	
1966–67	WRD Stevenson	
1968–69	CH Dunlop	
1970–71	JK Bowen	
1972–73	JR Broadbent	
1974–75	Alan Loxton	
1976–77	MM Hooke	
1978	DG Barr	
1979	DG Mackay	
1980	AJ Mitchell	
1981	MJ Gill	
1982	Mahla Pearlman	
1983	DE McLachlan	
1984	Rod McGeoch	
1985	F Herron	
1986	Kim A Garling	
1987	KH Dufty	
1988	WV Windeyer	
1989	BE Thornton	
1990	GM Roberson	
1991	DA de Carvalho	
1992	John R Marsden	Founding Partner, Marsdens Law Group
1993	John Nelson	Partner, Gadens
1994	DG Fairlie	
1995	DM Stack	
1996	ND Lyall	
1997	PV Fair	
1998	Ron K Heinrich	
1999	Margaret C Hole	
2000	John FS North	
2001	Nick K Meagher	
2002	Kim Cull	
2003	Robert JC Benjamin	
2004	Gordon A Salier	
2005	John E McIntyre	
2006	June McPhie	
2007	Geoff J Dunlevy	Partner, Rhodes Kildea
2008	Hugh I Macken	
2009	Joseph J Catanzariti	Partner, Clayton Utz
2010	Mary J Macken	
2011	Stuart D Westgarth	Partner, HWL Ebsworth
2012	Justin J Dowd	Partner, Watts McCray
2013	John C Dobson	
2014	Ros E Everett	Partner, Everett Evans
2015	John F Eades	Partner, Noyce, Salmon & D'Aquino
2016	Gary S Ulman	Partner, Minter Ellison
2017	Pauline Wright	Partner, PJ Donnellan & Co
2018	Doug Humphreys OAM	
2019	Elizabeth Espinosa	
2020	Richard Harvey	
2021	Juliana Warner	
2022	Joanne van der Plaat	
2023	Cassandra Banks	
2024	Brett McGrath	Partner, Marsdens Law Group
2025	Jennifer Ball	Senior Partner, Clayton Utz
2026	Ronan MacSweeney	

== Structure and organisation ==
The Law Society is governed by an internal Council, the Legal Profession Act 2004 (NSW) and the Corporations Act 2001 (Cth). The Council meets monthly and has 15 elected members who sit for 3 year terms and one appointed member who sits for 1 year. The Council has 1 country lawyer councillor, 1 suburban lawyer councillor, 1 city lawyer councillor, 1 corporate lawyer councillor, 1 government lawyer councillor, 1 large firm lawyer councillor, 1 NSW Young Lawyers councillor (appointed), and 8 general councillors. Law Society Councillors sit on the boards of LawCover (legal insurer), the NSW Legal Practitioners Fidelity Fund, the Legal Profession Admissions Board, the Public Interest Advocacy Centre (among others).

The Law Society has 23 committees devoted to different aspects of law.

== Pro-bono work ==
The society started a voluntary "Pro Bono Scheme" in 1992.

== Journal ==
The Law Society Journal
- Discipline: Law
- Language: English
- Edited by: Amy Dale

Publication details
- Publisher: Law Society of New South Wales
- Frequency: Quarterly

Standard abbreviations
- ISO 4: Law Soc. J.

Indexing
- ISSN: 1839-5287

Links
- Journal homepage

The Law Society Journal is a news organisation owned by the society. Published since 1963, the journal is funded by mandatory membership fees paid to the society by New South Wales lawyers.

The Law Society Journal is published quarterly and has an audited distribution of 26,746 as at September 2023.

== See also ==
- Australian and New Zealand Law and History Society
- Law Council of Australia
- Law Institute of Victoria
- Law society
