= List of acts of the Parliament of Victoria from 2006 =

This is a list of acts of the Parliament of Victoria, Australia for the year 2006.

== 2006 ==
Short title, or popular name	Citation	Royal assent
Long title
Crimes (Family Violence) (Holding Powers) Act 2006 (repealed)	No. 1 of 2006	7 March 2006
An Act to amend the Crimes (Family Violence) Act 1987 (Note: Crimes (Family Violence) Act 1987 (No. 19 of 1987)) to provide police with holding powers in family violence situations and for other purposes. (Repealed by Legislation Reform (Repeals No. 3) Act 2008 (No. 53 of 2008))
Crimes (Sexual Offences) Act 2006 (repealed)	No. 2 of 2006	7 March 2006
(Repealed by Legislation Reform (Repeals No. 3) Act 2008 (No. 53 of 2008))
Guardianship and Administration (Further Amendment) Act 2006 (repealed)	No. 3 of 2006	7 March 2006
(Repealed by Legislation Reform (Repeals No. 3) Act 2008 (No. 53 of 2008))
Prahran Mechanics' Institute (Amendment) Act 2006	No. 4 of 2006	7 March 2006
An Act to amend the Prahran Mechanics' Institute Act 1899 (Note: Prahran Mechanics' Institute Act 1899 (63 Vict. No. 1617)) and for other purposes.
Terrorism (Community Protection) (Amendment) Act 2006 (repealed)	No. 5 of 2006	
(Repealed by Legislation Reform (Repeals No. 3) Act 2008 (No. 53 of 2008))
Crimes (Document Destruction) Act 2006 (repealed)	No. 6 of 2006	
(Repealed by Legislation Reform (Repeals No. 3) Act 2008 (No. 53 of 2008))
Gambling Regulation (Miscellaneous Amendments) Act 2006 (repealed)	No. 7 of 2006	
(Repealed by Legislation Reform (Repeals No. 3) Act 2008 (No. 53 of 2008))
Liquor Control Reform (Amendment) Act 2006 (repealed)	No. 8 of 2006	
(Repealed by Legislation Reform (Repeals No. 3) Act 2008 (No. 53 of 2008))
Rail Safety Act 2006	No. 9 of 2006	4 April 2006
An Act to provide for safe rail operations in Victoria, to amend the Transport Act 1983, (Note: Transport Act 1983 (No. 9921)) the Public Transport Competition Act 1995, (Note: Public Transport Competition Act 1995 (No. 68 of 1995)) the Rail Corporations Act 1996, (Note: Rail Corporations Act 1996 (No. 79 of 1996)) the Electricity Industry Act 2000, (Note: Electricity Industry Act 2000 (No. 68 of 2000)) the Gas Industry Act 2001, (Note: Gas Industry Act 2001 (No. 31 of 2001)) the Magistrates' Court Act 1989, (Note: Magistrates' Court Act 1989 (No. 51 of 1989)) the Road Management Act 2004, (Note: Road Management Act 2004 (No. 12 of 2004)) the Water Act 1989, (Note: Water Act 1989 (No. 80 of 1989)) the Water Industry Act 1994 (Note: Water Industry Act 1994 (No. 121 of 1994)) and for other purposes.
Transport Legislation (Safety Investigations) Act 2006 (repealed)	No. 10 of 2006	
(Repealed by Legislation Reform (Repeals No. 3) Act 2008 (No. 53 of 2008))
Drugs, Poisons and Controlled Substances (Volatile Substances) (Extension of Provisions) Act 2006 (repealed)	No. 11 of 2006	
(Repealed by Legislation Reform (Repeals No. 3) Act 2008 (No. 53 of 2008))
Infringements Act 2006	No. 12 of 2006	11 April 2006
An Act to provide for a new framework for the issuing and serving of infringement notices for offences and the enforcement of infringement notices, to amend the Magistrates' Court Act 1989, the Road Safety Act 1986 (Note: Road Safety Act 1986 (No. 127 of 1986)) and the Subordinate Legislation Act 1994 (Note: Subordinate Legislation Act 1994 (No. 104 of 1994)) and for other purposes.
Interpretation of Legislation (Further Amendment) Act 2006 (repealed)	No. 13 of 2006	11 April 2006
(Repealed by Legislation Reform (Repeals No. 3) Act 2008 (No. 53 of 2008))
Justice Legislation (Miscellaneous Amendments) Act 2006 (repealed)	No. 14 of 2006	11 April 2006
(Repealed by Legislation Reform (Repeals No. 3) Act 2008 (No. 53 of 2008))
Public Sector Employment (Award Entitlements) Act 2006	No. 15 of 2006	11 April 2006
An Act to protect employment entitlements of certain public sector employees, to amend the Workplace Rights Advocate Act 2005 (Note: Workplace Rights Advocate Act 2005 (No. 100 of 2005)) and the Commonwealth Powers (Industrial Relations) Act 1996 (Note: Commonwealth Powers (Industrial Relations) Act 1996 (No. 59 of 1996)) and for other purposes.
Aboriginal Heritage Act 2006	No. 16 of 2006	9 May 2006
An Act to provide for the protection of Aboriginal cultural heritage in Victoria, to repeal the Archaeological and Aboriginal Relics Preservation Act 1972 (Note: Archaeological and Aboriginal Relics Preservation Act 1972 (No. 8273)) and for other purposes.
Drugs, Poisons and Controlled Substances (Aged Care Services) Act 2006 (repealed)	No. 17 of 2006	
(Repealed by Legislation Reform (Repeals No. 3) Act 2008 (No. 53 of 2008))
Drugs, Poisons and Controlled Substances (Prohibition of Display and Sale of Cocaine Kits) Act 2006 (repealed)	No. 18 of 2006	
(Repealed by Legislation Reform (Repeals No. 3) Act 2008 (No. 53 of 2008))
Land (St Kilda Triangle) Act 2006	No. 19 of 2006	
Road Safety (Drugs) Act 2006 (repealed)	No. 20 of 2006	
(Repealed by Legislation Reform (Repeals No. 3) Act 2008 (No. 53 of 2008))
Sustainable Forests (Timber) (Amendment) Act 2006 (repealed)	No. 21 of 2006	
(Repealed by Legislation Reform (Repeals No. 3) Act 2008 (No. 53 of 2008))
Valuation of Land (Amendment) Act 2006 (repealed)	No. 22 of 2006	
(Repealed by Legislation Reform (Repeals No. 3) Act 2008 (No. 53 of 2008))
Disability Act 2006	No. 23 of 2006	16 May 2006
An Act to enact a new legislative scheme for persons with a disability, to repeal the Intellectually Disabled Persons' Services Act 1986 (Note: Intellectually Disabled Persons' Services Act 1986 (No. 53 of 1986)) and the Disability Services Act 1991, (Note: Disability Services Act 1991 (No. 80 of 1991)) to amend certain other Acts and for other purposes.
Education and Training Reform Act 2006	No. 24 of 2006	16 May 2006
An Act to reform the law relating to education and training in Victoria to provide for a high standard of education and training for all Victorians and for other purposes.
Equal Opportunity and Tolerance Legislation (Amendment) Act 2006	No. 25 of 2006	
Financial Management (Miscellaneous Amendments) Act 2006 (repealed)	No. 26 of 2006	
(Repealed by Legislation Reform (Repeals No. 3) Act 2008 (No. 53 of 2008))
Justice Legislation (Further Miscellaneous Amendments) Act 2006 (repealed)	No. 27 of 2006	
(Repealed by Legislation Reform (Repeals No. 3) Act 2008 (No. 53 of 2008))
Melbourne Sailors' Home (Repeal) Act 2006	No. 28 of 2006	6 June 2006
An Act to repeal the Melbourne Sailors' Home Act 1986, (Note: Melbourne Sailors' Home Act 1986 (No. 5 of 1986)) to close the Sailors' Welfare Fund established under that Act, to provide for the transfer of all money standing to the credit of the Sailors' Welfare Fund to the Consolidated Fund and for other purposes.
Statute Law (Further Revision) Act 2006	No. 29 of 2006	6 June 2006
An Act to revise further the Statute Law of Victoria.
Terrorism (Community Protection) (Further Amendment) Act 2006 (repealed)	No. 30 of 2006	
(Repealed by Legislation Reform (Repeals No. 3) Act 2008 (No. 53 of 2008))
Energy Legislation (Miscellaneous Amendments) Act 2006 (repealed)	No. 31 of 2006	
(Repealed by Legislation Reform (Repeals No. 3) Act 2008 (No. 53 of 2008))
Infringements (Consequential and Other Amendments) Act 2006 (repealed)	No. 32 of 2006	
(Repealed by Legislation Reform (Repeals No. 3) Act 2008 (No. 53 of 2008))
Planning and Environment (Growth Areas Authority) Act 2006	No. 33 of 2006	
Primary Industries Acts (Miscellaneous Amendments) Act 2006 (repealed)	No. 34 of 2006	
(Repealed by Legislation Reform (Repeals No. 3) Act 2008 (No. 53 of 2008))
Victorian Urban Development Authority (Amendment) Act 2006	No. 35 of 2006	
Appropriation (2006/2007) Act 2006	No. 36 of 2006	
Appropriation (Parliament 2006/2007) Act 2006	No. 37 of 2006	
State Taxation (Reductions and Concessions) Act 2006 (repealed)	No. 38 of 2006	
(Repealed by Legislation Reform (Repeals No. 3) Act 2008 (No. 53 of 2008))
Transfer of Land (Alpine Resorts) Act 2006 (repealed)	No. 39 of 2006	
(Repealed by Legislation Reform (Repeals No. 3) Act 2008 (No. 53 of 2008))
Victoria Racing Club Act 2006	No. 40 of 2006	20 June 2006
An Act to provide for the functions, powers and responsibilities of Victoria Racing Club Limited in respect of Flemington Racecourse, to provide for the transfer of assets, rights and liabilities held by or on behalf of the Victoria Racing Club to Victoria Racing Club Limited, to repeal The Victoria Racing Club Act 1871 (Note: Victoria Racing Club Act 1871 (35 Vict. No. 398)) and for other purposes.
Accident Compensation and Other Legislation (Amendment) Act 2006 (repealed)	No. 41 of 2006	
(Repealed by Legislation Reform (Repeals No. 3) Act 2008 (No. 53 of 2008))
Building and Construction Industry Security of Payment (Amendment) Act 2006	No. 42 of 2006	
Charter of Human Rights and Responsibilities Act 2006	No. 43 of 2006	25 July 2006
An Act to protect and promote human rights, to make consequential amendments to certain Acts and for other purposes.
Electoral and Parliamentary Committees Legislation (Amendment) Act 2006 (repealed)	No. 44 of 2006	
(Repealed by Legislation Reform (Repeals No. 3) Act 2008 (No. 53 of 2008))
Health Legislation (Infertility Treatment and Medical Treatment) Act 2006 (repealed)	No. 45 of 2006	
(Repealed by Legislation Reform (Repeals No. 3) Act 2008 (No. 53 of 2008))
Land (Further Miscellaneous) Act 2006	No. 46 of 2006	
Transport Legislation (Further Amendment) Act 2006 (repealed)	No. 47 of 2006	
(Repealed by Legislation Reform (Repeals No. 3) Act 2008 (No. 53 of 2008))
Children, Youth and Families (Consequential and Other Amendments) Act 2006 (repealed)	No. 48 of 2006	
(Repealed by Legislation Reform (Repeals No. 3) Act 2008 (No. 53 of 2008))
Corrections and Other Justice Legislation (Amendment) Act 2006 (repealed)	No. 49 of 2006	
(Repealed by Legislation Reform (Repeals No. 3) Act 2008 (No. 53 of 2008))
Courts Legislation (Jurisdiction) Act 2006	No. 50 of 2006	
Courts Legislation (Neighbourhood Justice Centre) Act 2006	No. 51 of 2006	
Drugs, Poisons and Controlled Substances (Amendment) Act 2006 (repealed)	No. 52 of 2006	
(Repealed by Legislation Reform (Repeals No. 3) Act 2008 (No. 53 of 2008))
Evidence (Document Unavailability) Act 2006	No. 53 of 2006	
Gambling Regulation (Further Miscellaneous Amendments) Act 2006 (repealed)	No. 54 of 2006	
(Repealed by Legislation Reform (Repeals No. 3) Act 2008 (No. 53 of 2008))
Health Services (Supported Residential Services) Act 2006 (repealed)	No. 55 of 2006	
(Repealed by Legislation Reform (Repeals No. 3) Act 2008 (No. 53 of 2008))
Long Service Leave (Preservation of Entitlements) Act 2006	No. 56 of 2006	
National Parks and Crown Land (Reserves) Acts (Amendment) Act 2006 (repealed)	No. 57 of 2006	
(Repealed by Legislation Reform (Repeals No. 3) Act 2008 (No. 53 of 2008))
Coptic Orthodox Church (Victoria) Property Trust Act 2006	No. 58 of 2006	29 August 2006
An Act to establish a corporate trustee for the Coptic Orthodox Church within the Diocese of Melbourne and Affiliated Regions to hold property for the benefit of the Coptic Orthodox Church in that Diocese, to provide for the vesting of certain property in the trustee, to cancel the incorporation of certain associations and for other purposes.
Coroners and Human Tissue Acts (Amendment) Act 2006 (repealed)	No. 59 of 2006	29 August 2006
(Repealed by Legislation Reform (Repeals No. 3) Act 2008 (No. 53 of 2008))
Energy Legislation (Hardship, Metering and Other Matters) Act 2006	No. 60 of 2006	29 August 2006
(Repealed by Legislation Reform (Repeals No. 3) Act 2008 (No. 53 of 2008))
Environment Protection (Amendment) Act 2006 (repealed)	No. 61 of 2006	29 August 2006
(Repealed by Legislation Reform (Repeals No. 3) Act 2008 (No. 53 of 2008))
Melbourne University (Victorian College of the Arts) Act 2006	No. 62 of 2006	29 August 2006
An Act to provide for the integration of the Victorian College of the Arts with the University of Melbourne, to repeal the Victorian College of the Arts Act 1981, (Note: Victorian College of the Arts Act 1981 (No. 9566)) to amend the Melbourne University Act 1958 (Note: University Act 1958 (No. 6405)) and for other purposes.
Mineral Resources Development (Sustainable Development) Act 2006	No. 63 of 2006	29 August 2006
Snowy Hydro Corporatisation (Parliamentary Approval) Act 2006	No. 64 of 2006	29 August 2006
An Act to amend the Snowy Hydro Corporatisation Act 1997 (Note: Snowy Hydro Corporatisation Act 1997 (No. 105 of 1997)) to prevent the sale of shares in Snowy Hydro Limited held by the State of Victoria without the approval of both Houses of Parliament and for other purposes.
Victims' Charter Act 2006	No. 65 of 2006	29 August 2006
An Act to recognise principles governing the response to victims of crime by the criminal justice system and for other purposes.
World Swimming Championships (Amendment) Act 2006 (repealed)	No. 66 of 2006	
(Repealed by Legislation Reform (Repeals No. 3) Act 2008 (No. 53 of 2008))
Catchment and Land Protection (Further Amendment) Act 2006 (repealed)	No. 67 of 2006	
(Repealed by Legislation Reform (Repeals No. 3) Act 2008 (No. 53 of 2008))
Heritage Rivers (Further Protection) Act 2006 (repealed)	No. 68 of 2006	
(Repealed by Legislation Reform (Repeals No. 3) Act 2008 (No. 53 of 2008))
Owners Corporations Act 2006	No. 69 of 2006	19 September 2006
An Act to provide for the management, powers and functions of owners corporations and for appropriate mechanisms for the resolution of disputes relating to owners corporations, to amend the Subdivision Act 1988 (Note: Subdivision Act 1988 (No. 53 of 1988)) in relation to the creation of owners corporations, to amend other Acts and for other purposes.
Surveillance Devices (Workplace Privacy) Act 2006 (repealed)	No. 70 of 2006	19 September 2006
An Act to amend the Surveillance Devices Act 1999 (Note: Surveillance Devices Act 1999 (No. 21 of 1999)) so as to enhance its operation in workplaces and for other purposes. (Repealed by Legislation Reform (Repeals No. 3) Act 2008 (No. 53 of 2008))
Transport (Taxi-cab Accreditation and Other Amendments) Act 2006	No. 71 of 2006	
Victorian Renewable Energy Act 2006	No. 72 of 2006	
Charities (Amendment) Act 2006 (repealed)	No. 73 of 2006	Charities (Amendment) Act 2006
An Act to amend the Charities Act 1978 (Note: Charities Act 1978 (No. 9227)) to make further provision for charitable trusts, to amend the Religious Successory and Charitable Trusts Act 1958 (Note: Religious Successory and Charitable Trusts Act 1958 (No. 6357)) and the Property Law Act 1958 (Note: Property Law Act 1958 (No. 6344)) and for other purposes. (Repealed by Legislation Reform (Repeals No. 3) Act 2008 (No. 53 of 2008))
City of Melbourne and Docklands Acts (Governance) Act 2006	No. 74 of 2006	Charities (Amendment) Act 2006
Conveyancers Act 2006	No. 75 of 2006	10 October 2006
An Act to regulate the carrying out of conveyancing work, to repeal Part 7.1 of the Legal Profession Act 2004, (Note: Legal Profession Act 2004 (No. 99 of 2004)) to make consequential amendments to other Acts and for other purposes.
Crimes (Sexual Offences) (Further Amendment) Act 2006 (repealed)	No. 76 of 2006	
(Repealed by Legislation Reform (Repeals No. 3) Act 2008 (No. 53 of 2008))
Funerals Act 2006	No. 77 of 2006	
Human Services (Complex Needs) (Amendment) Act 2006 (repealed)	No. 78 of 2006	
(Repealed by Legislation Reform (Repeals No. 3) Act 2008 (No. 53 of 2008))
Justice Legislation (Further Amendment) Act 2006	No. 79 of 2006	
Public Sector Acts (Further Workplace Protection and Other Matters) Act 2006 (repealed)	No. 80 of 2006	
(Repealed by Legislation Reform (Repeals No. 3) Act 2008 (No. 53 of 2008))
Road Legislation (Projects and Road Safety) Act 2006	No. 81 of 2006	
Sentencing (Suspended Sentences) Act 2006 (repealed)	No. 82 of 2006	
(Repealed by Legislation Reform (Repeals No. 3) Act 2008 (No. 53 of 2008))
Serious Sex Offenders Monitoring (Amendment) Act 2006 (repealed)	No. 83 of 2006	
(Repealed by Legislation Reform (Repeals No. 3) Act 2008 (No. 53 of 2008))
State Taxation Legislation (Miscellaneous Amendments) Act 2006 (repealed)	No. 84 of 2006	
(Repealed by Legislation Reform (Repeals No. 3) Act 2008 (No. 53 of 2008))
Water (Governance) Act 2006 (repealed)	No. 85 of 2006	
(Repealed by Legislation Reform (Repeals No. 3) Act 2008 (No. 53 of 2008))
State Taxation Legislation Amendment (Housing Affordability) Act 2006	No. 86 of 2006	22 December 2006
An Act to amend the Duties Act 2000, (Note: Duties Act 2000 (No. 79 of 2000)) the First Home Owner Grant Act 2000 (Note: First Home Owner Grant Act 2000 (No. 5 of 2000)) and the Pay-roll Tax Act 1971 (Note: Pay-roll Tax Act 1971 (No. 8154)) to improve housing affordability and bring forward pay-roll tax cuts and for other purposes.

== Sources ==
- "Acts as made: 2006". Victoria Legislation.
