= List of acts of the Parliament of Victoria from 2011 =

This is a list of acts of the Parliament of Victoria, Australia for the year 2011.

== 2011 ==
Short title, or popular name	Citation	Royal assent
Long title
Civil Procedure and Legal Profession Amendment Act 2011	No. 1 of 2011	29 March 2011
An Act to amend the Civil Procedure Act 2010 (Note: Civil Procedure Act 2010 (No. 47 of 2010)) to repeal the pre-litigation requirements and make related amendments, to make a minor amendment to the Legal Profession Act 2004 (Note: Legal Profession Act 2004 (No. 99 of 2004)) and for other purposes.
Police Regulation Amendment (Protective Services Officers) Act 2011	No. 2 of 2011	
Shop Trading Reform Amendment (Easter Sunday) Act 2011	No. 3 of 2011	
Shrine of Remembrance Amendment Act 2011	No. 4 of 2011	
Building Amendment Act 2011	No. 5 of 2011	
Bushfires Royal Commission Implementation Monitor Act 2011	No. 6 of 2011	
Parliamentary Committees Amendment Act 2011	No. 7 of 2011	
Regional Growth Fund Act 2011	No. 8 of 2011	
Sentencing Further Amendment Act 2011	No. 9 of 2011	
Country Fire Authority Amendment (Volunteer Charter) Act 2011	No. 10 of 2011	
Education and Training Reform Amendment (School Safety) Act 2011	No. 11 of 2011	
Justice Legislation Amendment Act 2011	No. 12 of 2011	
Liquor Control Reform Amendment Act 2011	No. 13 of 2011	
Multicultural Victoria Act 2011	No. 14 of 2011	10 May 2011
An Act to repeal and re-enact with amendments the Multicultural Victoria Act 2004 (Note: Multicultural Victoria Act 2004 (No. 100 of 2004)) and for other purposes.
Dental Hospital Land Act 2011	No. 15 of 2011	
Family Violence Protection Amendment (Safety Notices) Act 2011	No. 16 of 2011	
Health Services Amendment (Health Innovation and Reform Council) Act 2011	No. 17 of 2011	
Residential Tenancies Amendment (Public Housing) Act 2011	No. 18 of 2011	
Victoria Law Foundation Amendment Act 2011	No. 19 of 2011	
Crimes Amendment (Bullying) Act 2011	No. 20 of 2011	7 June 2011
An Act to amend the Crimes Act 1958, (Note: Crimes Act 1958 (No. 6231)) the Stalking Intervention Orders Act 2008 (Note: Stalking Intervention Orders Act 2008 (No. 68 of 2008)) and the Personal Safety Intervention Orders Act 2010 (Note: Personal Safety Intervention Orders Act 2010 (No. 53 of 2010)) and for other purposes.
Fisheries Amendment Act 2011	No. 21 of 2011	
Public Holidays Amendment Act 2011	No. 22 of 2011	
Appropriation (2011/2012) Act 2011 (repealed)	No. 23 of 2011	21 June 2011
An Act for the appropriation of certain sums out of the Consolidated Fund for the ordinary annual services of the Government for the financial year 2011/2012 and for other purposes. (Repealed by Statute Law Repeals Act 2017 (No. 17 of 2017))
Appropriation (Parliament 2011/2012) Act 2011 (repealed)	No. 24 of 2011	21 June 2011
An Act for the appropriation of certain sums out of the Consolidated Fund for the Parliament in respect of the financial year 2011/2012 and for other purposes. (Repealed by Statute Law Repeals Act 2017 (No. 17 of 2017))
Environment Protection Amendment (Landfill Levies) Act 2011	No. 25 of 2011	21 June 2011
Equal Opportunity Amendment Act 2011	No. 26 of 2011	21 June 2011
Justice Legislation Amendment (Infringement Offences) Act 2011	No. 27 of 2011	21 June 2011
State Taxation Acts Amendment Act 2011	No. 28 of 2011	21 June 2011
Statute Law Revision Act 2011	No. 29 of 2011	21 June 2011
An Act to revise the statute law of Victoria.
Aboriginal Heritage Amendment Act 2011	No. 30 of 2011	
Planning and Environment Amendment (Growth Areas Infrastructure Contribution) Act 2011	No. 31 of 2011	
Road Safety Amendment (Hoon Driving and Other Matters) Act 2011	No. 32 of 2011	
Terrorism (Community Protection) Amendment Act 2011	No. 33 of 2011	
Transport Legislation Amendment (Taxi Services Reform and Other Matters) Act 2011	No. 34 of 2011	5 July 2011
An Act to amend the Transport Integration Act 2010 (Note: Transport Integration Act 2010 (No. 6 of 2010)) to establish the Taxi Services Commission and to amend the Transport (Compliance and Miscellaneous) Act 1983 (Note: Transport Act 1983 (No. 9921)) and other Acts to make consequential and related amendments and for other purposes.
Victorian Urban Development Authority Amendment (Urban Renewal Authority Victoria) Act 2011	No. 35 of 2011	
Consumer Acts Amendment Act 2011	No. 36 of 2011	
Parliamentary Salaries and Superannuation Amendment Act 2011	No. 37 of 2011	
Transport Legislation Amendment (Port of Hastings Development Authority) Act 2011	No. 38 of 2011	
Domestic Animals Amendment (Restricted Breeds) Act 2011 (repealed)	No. 39 of 2011	
(Repealed by Statute Law Revision Act 2013 (No. 70 of 2013)
Accident Towing Services Amendment Act 2011	No. 40 of 2011	
Drugs, Poisons and Controlled Substances Amendment (Drugs of Dependence) Act 2011	No. 41 of 2011	6 September 2011
An Act for an Act to amend the Drugs, Poisons and Controlled Substances Act 1981 (Note: Drugs, Poisons and Controlled Substances Act 1981 (No. 9719)) to provide for the inclusion of substances as drugs of dependence and for other purposes.
Farm Debt Mediation Act 2011	No. 42 of 2011	
Justice Legislation Amendment (Protective Services Officers) Act 2011	No. 43 of 2011	
Local Government Amendment (Electoral Matters) Act 2011	No. 44 of 2011	
Health Practitioner Regulation National Law (Victoria) Amendment Act 2011	No. 45 of 2011	
Parliamentary Salaries and Superannuation Further Amendment Act 2011	No. 46 of 2011	
Road Safety Camera Commissioner Act 2011	No. 47 of 2011	22 September 2011
An Act to establish the office of Road Safety Camera Commissioner and for other purposes.
Sentencing Legislation Amendment (Abolition of Home Detention) Act 2011	No. 48 of 2011	
Transport Legislation Amendment (Public Transport Safety) Act 2011	No. 49 of 2011	
Commercial Arbitration Act 2011	No. 50 of 2011	18 October 2011
An Act relating to the conduct of commercial arbitrations, to repeal the Commercial Arbitration Act 1984 (Note: Commercial Arbitration Act 1984 (No. 10167)) and for other purposes.
Drugs, Poisons and Controlled Substances Amendment (Prohibition of Display and Sale of Cannabis Water Pipes) Act 2011	No. 51 of 2011	
Electronic Transactions (Victoria) Amendment Act 2011	No. 52 of 2011	18 October 2011
An Act to amend the Electronic Transactions (Victoria) Act 2000 (Note: Electronic Transactions (Victoria) Act 2000 (No. 20 of 2000)) and for other purposes.
Resources Legislation Amendment Act 2011	No. 53 of 2011	
Children, Youth and Families Amendment (Security of Youth Justice Facilities) Act 2011	No. 54 of 2011	
Crimes and Domestic Animals Acts Amendment (Offences and Penalties) Act 2011	No. 55 of 2011	
Emergency Management Legislation Amendment Act 2011	No. 56 of 2011	
Extractive Industries (Lysterfield) Amendment Act 2011	No. 57 of 2011	
Victorian Commission for Gambling and Liquor Regulation Act 2011 or the Victorian Gambling and Casino Control Commission Act 2011	No. 58 of 2011	2 November 2011
An Act to establish the Victorian Commission for Gambling and Liquor Regulation, to amend the Gambling Regulation Act 2003, (Note: Gambling Regulation Act 2003 (No. 114 of 2003)) the Liquor Control Reform Act 1998 (Note: Liquor Control Reform Act 1998 (No. 94 of 1998)) and other Acts and for other purposes.
Energy Legislation Amendment (Bushfire Mitigation and Other Matters) Act 2011	No. 59 of 2011	
Gambling Regulation Amendment (Licensing) Act 2011	No. 60 of 2011	
Transport Legislation Amendment (Public Transport Development Authority) Act 2011	No. 61 of 2011	
Victorian Responsible Gambling Foundation Act 2011	No. 62 of 2011	
Water Legislation Amendment (Water Infrastructure Charges) Act 2011	No. 63 of 2011	
Electricity Industry Amendment (Transitional Feed-in Tariff Scheme) Act 2011	No. 64 of 2011	
Sentencing Amendment (Community Correction Reform) Act 2011	No. 65 of 2011	
Independent Broad-based Anti-corruption Commission Act 2011	No. 66 of 2011	29 November 2011
An Act to establish the Independent Broad-based Anti-corruption Commission, to amend the Parliamentary Committees Act 2003 (Note: Parliamentary Committees Act 2003 (No. 110 of 2003)) and certain other Acts, and for other purposes.
Justice Legislation Further Amendment Act 2011	No. 67 of 2011	
Mines (Aluminium Agreement) Amendment Act 2011	No. 68 of 2011	
State Taxation Acts Further Amendment Act 2011	No. 69 of 2011	
Victorian Inspectorate Act 2011 or the Integrity Oversight Victoria Act 2011	No. 70 of 2011	29 November 2011
An Act to establish the Victorian Inspectorate to provide oversight of the Independent Broad-based Anti-corruption Commission, to amend certain Acts and for other purposes.
Liquor Control Reform Further Amendment Act 2011	No. 71 of 2011	
Public Interest Monitor Act 2011	No. 72 of 2011	
Sex Work and Other Acts Amendment Act 2011	No. 73 of 2011	
City of Melbourne Amendment Act 2011	No. 74 of 2011	
Domestic Animals Amendment (Puppy Farm Enforcement and Other Matters) Act 2011	No. 75 of 2011	
Education and Training Reform Amendment (Skills) Act 2011	No. 76 of 2011	
Road Safety Amendment (Drinking while Driving) Act 2011	No. 77 of 2011	
Transport Legislation Amendment (Marine Safety and Other Amendments) Act 2011	No. 78 of 2011	
Business Names (Commonwealth Powers) Act 2011	No. 79 of 2011	
Children's Services Amendment Act 2011	No. 80 of 2011	
Criminal Procedure Amendment (Double Jeopardy and Other Matters) Act 2011	No. 81 of 2011	
Leo Cussen Institute (Registration as a Company) Act 2011	No. 82 of 2011	
Serious Sex Offenders (Detention and Supervision) Amendment Act 2011	No. 83 of 2011	21 December 2011
An Act to amend the Serious Sex Offenders (Detention and Supervision) Act 2009, (Note: Serious Sex Offenders (Detention and Supervision) Act 2009 (No. 91 of 2009)) to make consequential and related amendments to other Acts and for other purposes.

== Sources ==
- "Acts as made: 2011". Victoria Legislation.
