= The College of Law =

The College of Law may refer to:

- The College of Law (Australia), postgraduate school for the study of law
- The former name of University of Law, a private university in the United Kingdom, providing law degrees
