= List of acts of the Parliament of Victoria from 2014 =

This is a list of acts of the Parliament of Victoria, Australia for the year 2014.

== 2014 ==
Short title, or popular name	Citation	Royal assent
Long title
Court Services Victoria Act 2014	No. 1 of 2014	11 February 2014
An Act to establish Court Services Victoria and for other purposes.
Electricity Safety Amendment (Bushfire Mitigation) Act 2014	No. 2 of 2014	
Energy Legislation Amendment (General) Act 2014	No. 3 of 2014	
Gambling Regulation Amendment (Pre-commitment) Act 2014	No. 4 of 2014	
Local Government Amendment (Performance Reporting and Accountability) Act 2014	No. 5 of 2014	
Public Administration Amendment (Public Sector Improvement) Act 2014	No. 6 of 2014	
Crimes Amendment (Grooming) Act 2014	No. 7 of 2014	
Domestic Animals Amendment Act 2014	No. 8 of 2014	
Drugs, Poisons and Controlled Substances Amendment Act 2014	No. 9 of 2014	
Mineral Resources (Sustainable Development) Amendment Act 2014	No. 10 of 2014	
Sustainable Forests (Timber) and Wildlife Amendment Act 2014	No. 11 of 2014	
Corrections Legislation Amendment Act 2014	No. 12 of 2014	
Drugs, Poisons and Controlled Substances (Poppy Cultivation and Processing) Amendment Act 2014	No. 13 of 2014	
Small Business Commissioner Amendment Act 2014	No. 14 of 2014	
Summary Offences and Sentencing Amendment Act 2014	No. 15 of 2014	
Travel Agents Repeal Act 2014	No. 16 of 2014	18 March 2014
An Act to repeal the Travel Agents Act 1986 (Note: Travel Agents Act 1986 (No. 52 of 1986)) and for other purposes.
Legal Profession Uniform Law Application Act 2014	No. 17 of 2014	25 March 2014
An Act to apply the Legal Profession Uniform Law as a law of Victoria, to provide for certain local matters to complement that Law, to repeal the Legal Profession Act 2004, (Note: Legal Profession Act 2004 (No. 99 of 2004)) to make transitional arrangements, to make consequential amendments to other Acts and for other purposes.
Corrections Amendment (Parole) Act 2014	No. 18 of 2014	
Education and Training Reform Amendment (Registration of Early Childhood Teachers and Victorian Institute of Teaching) Act 2014	No. 19 of 2014	
Environment Protection and Sustainability Victoria Amendment Act 2014	No. 20 of 2014	
Gambling and Liquor Legislation Amendment (Reduction of Red Tape) Act 2014	No. 21 of 2014	
Health Services Amendment Act 2014	No. 22 of 2014	
Victorian Civil and Administrative Tribunal Amendment Act 2014	No. 23 of 2014	
Game Management Authority Act 2014	No. 24 of 2014	8 April 2014
An Act to establish the Game Management Authority, to amend the Wildlife Act 1975 (Note: Wildlife Act 1975 (No. 8699)) and the Conservation, Forests and Lands Act 1987 (Note: Conservation, Forests and Lands Act 1987 (No. 41 of 1987)) and other Acts and for other purposes.
Justice Legislation Amendment (Discovery, Disclosure and Other Matters) Act 2014	No. 25 of 2014	8 April 2014
Mental Health Act 2014	No. 26 of 2014	8 April 2014
An Act to provide a legislative scheme for the treatment of persons with mental illness, to repeal the Mental Health Act 1986, (Note: Mental Health Act 1986 (No. 59 of 1986)) to make consequential amendments to the Sentencing Act 1991, (Note: Sentencing Act 1991 (No. 49 of 1991)) the Crimes (Mental Impairment and Unfitness to be Tried) Act 1997 (Note: Crimes (Mental Impairment and Unfitness to be Tried) Act 1997 (No. 65 of 1997)) and other Acts and for other purposes.
Transport (Safety Schemes Compliance and Enforcement) Act 2014	No. 27 of 2014	
Water Amendment (Water Trading) Act 2014	No. 28 of 2014	
Children, Youth and Families Amendment (Security Measures) Act 2014	No. 29 of 2014	
Fences Amendment Act 2014	No. 30 of 2014	
Corrections Amendment (Further Parole Reform) Act 2014	No. 31 of 2014	
Honorary Justices Act 2014	No. 32 of 2014	13 May 2014
An Act to provide for the appointment of justices of the peace and bail justices, together to be known as honorary justices, the use of titles by current and retired honorary justices and other matters relating to honorary justices and for other purposes.
Sale of Land Amendment Act 2014	No. 33 of 2014	
State Taxation Legislation Amendment Act 2014	No. 34 of 2014	
Transport Legislation Amendment (Further Taxi Reform and Other Matters) Act 2014	No. 35 of 2014	
Crimes Amendment (Protection of Children) Act 2014	No. 36 of 2014	
Victoria Police Amendment (Consequential and Other Matters) Act 2014	No. 37 of 2014	
Appropriation (2014-2015) Act 2014	No. 38 of 2014	17 June 2014
An Act for the appropriation of certain sums out of the Consolidated Fund for the ordinary annual services of the Government for the financial year 2014/2015 and for other purposes.
Appropriation (Parliament 2014-2015) Act 2014	No. 39 of 2014	17 June 2014
An Act for the appropriation of certain sums out of the Consolidated Fund for the Parliament in respect of the financial year 2014/2015 and for other purposes.
Building a Better Victoria (State Tax and Other Legislation Amendment) Act 2014	No. 40 of 2014	17 June 2014
An Act to amend the Duties Act 2000, (Note: Duties Act 2000 (No. 79 of 2000)) the First Home Owner Grant Act 2000, (Note: First Home Owner Grant Act 2000 (No. 5 of 2000)) the Land Tax Act 2005, (Note: Land Tax Act 2005 (No. 88 of 2005)) the Payroll Tax Act 2007, (Note: Payroll Tax Act 2007 (No. 26 of 2007)) the Planning and Environment Act 1987, (Note: Planning and Environment Act 1987 (No. 45 of 1987)) the Road Safety Act 1986 (Note: Road Safety Act 1986 (No. 127 of 1986)) and the Taxation Administration Act 1997 (Note: Taxation Administration Act 1997 (No. 40 of 1997)) and for other purposes.
Justice Legislation Amendment Act 2014	No. 41 of 2014	
Vexatious Proceedings Act 2014	No. 42 of 2014	
Witness Protection Amendment Act 2014	No. 43 of 2014	
Treasury Legislation and Other Acts Amendment Act 2014	No. 44 of 2014	
Corrections Amendment (Smoke-Free Prisons) Act 2014	No. 45 of 2014	
Energy Legislation Amendment (Customer Metering Protections and Other Matters) Act 2014	No. 46 of 2014	
Fines Reform Act 2014	No. 47 of 2014	1 July 2014
An Act to provide for the appointment of the Director, Fines Victoria, to provide for the collection and enforcement of infringement fines and court fines, to make amendments to the Infringements Act 2006 (Note: Infringements Act 2006 (No. 12 of 2006)) and the Sheriff Act 2009, (Note: Sheriff Act 2009 (No. 9 of 2009)) to consequentially amend other Acts and for other purposes.
Local Government (Brimbank City Council) Amendment Act 2014	No. 48 of 2014	
Road Safety Amendment Act 2014	No. 49 of 2014	
Consumer Affairs Legislation Amendment Act 2014	No. 50 of 2014	
Filming Approval Act 2014	No. 51 of 2014	12 August 2014
An Act to establish film friendly principles for the approval of film permits by public agencies, to provide for the making of film friendly guidelines and to make consequential amendments to other Acts and for other purposes.
Sentencing Amendment (Baseline Sentences) Act 2014	No. 52 of 2014	
Water Amendment (Flood Mitigation) Act 2014	No. 53 of 2014	
Crime Statistics Act 2014	No. 54 of 2014	
Criminal Organisations Control and Other Acts Amendment Act 2014	No. 55 of 2014	
Gambling and Liquor Legislation Amendment (Modernisation) Act 2014	No. 56 of 2014	
Powers of Attorney Act 2014	No. 57 of 2014	
Assisted Reproductive Treatment Further Amendment Act 2014	No. 58 of 2014	
Freedom of Information and Victorian Inspectorate Acts Amendment Act 2014	No. 59 of 2014	
Privacy and Data Protection Act 2014	No. 60 of 2014	
Children, Youth and Families Amendment (Permanent Care and Other Matters) Act 2014	No. 61 of 2014	
Courts Legislation Miscellaneous Amendments Act 2014	No. 62 of 2014	
Crimes Amendment (Abolition of Defensive Homicide) Act 2014	No. 63 of 2014	
Gambling and Liquor Legislation Further Amendment Act 2014	No. 64 of 2014	
Tobacco Amendment Act 2014	No. 65 of 2014	
Working with Children Amendment (Ministers of Religion and Other Matters) Act 2014	No. 66 of 2014	
Inquiries Act 2014	No. 67 of 2014	23 September 2014
An Act to provide for the establishment and conduct of inquiries in Victoria, to make related and consequential amendments to other Acts and for other purposes.
Resources Legislation Amendment (BTEX Prohibition and Other Matters) Act 2014	No. 68 of 2014	23 September 2014
An Act to amend the Geothermal Energy Resources Act 2005, (Note: Geothermal Energy Resources Act 2005 (No. 7 of 2005)) the Greenhouse Gas Geological Sequestration Act 2008, (Note: Greenhouse Gas Geological Sequestration Act 2008 (No. 61 of 2008)) the Mineral Resources (Sustainable Development) Act 1990 (Note: Mineral Resources Development Act 1990 (No. 92 of 1990)) and the Petroleum Act 1998 (Note: Petroleum Act 1998 (No. 96 of 1998)) to prohibit the use of BTEX (Note: BTEX refers to the chemicals benzene, toluene, ethylbenzene and xylenes.) chemicals in hydraulic fracturing and to make other amendments to those Acts, to amend the Offshore Petroleum and Greenhouse Gas Storage Act 2010 (Note: Offshore Petroleum and Greenhouse Gas Storage Act 2010 (No. 10 of 2010)) and the Pipelines Act 2005 (Note: Pipelines Act 2005 (No. 61 of 2005)) and for other purposes.
Sentencing Amendment (Emergency Workers) Act 2014	No. 69 of 2014	
Transfer of Land Amendment Act 2014	No. 70 of 2014	
Primary Industries Legislation Amendment Act 2014	No. 71 of 2014	
Sentencing Amendment (Coward's Punch Manslaughter and Other Matters) Act 2014	No. 72 of 2014	30 September 2014
An Act to amend the Crimes Act 1958 (Note: Crimes Act 1958 (No. 6231)) and the Sentencing Act 1991 in relation to manslaughter and to make minor technical amendments to other Acts and for other purposes.
Casino and Gambling Legislation Amendment Act 2014	No. 73 of 2014	
Crimes Amendment (Sexual Offences and Other Matters) Act 2014	No. 74 of 2014	
Drugs, Poisons and Controlled Substances Further Amendment Act 2014	No. 75 of 2014	
Emergency Management Amendment (Critical Infrastructure Resilience) Act 2014	No. 76 of 2014	21 October 2014
An Act to amend the Emergency Management Act 2013 to provide for emergency risk management arrangements for critical infrastructure resilience and to consequentially amend the Freedom of Information Act 1982 (Note: Freedom of Information Act 1982 (No. 9859)) and the Terrorism (Community Protection) Act 2003 (Note: Terrorism (Community Protection) Act 2003 (No. 7 of 2003)) and for other purposes.
Family Violence Protection Amendment Act 2014	No. 77 of 2014	21 October 2014
Improving Cancer Outcomes Act 2014	No. 78 of 2014	21 October 2014
An Act to articulate the role and functions of the Secretary to the Department of Health with respect to cancer, to establish a framework for the collection, management, use and disclosure of information relating to cancer, to require the preparation of a plan providing a strategic policy framework for cancer in Victoria, to provide for the registration of the Anti-Cancer Council of Victoria as a company limited by guarantee under the Corporations Act and to repeal the Cancer Act 1958 (Note: Cancer Act 1958 (No. 6213)) and for other purposes.
Justice Legislation Amendment (Confiscation and Other Matters) Act 2014	No. 79 of 2014	21 October 2014
Justice Legislation Amendment (Succession and Surrogacy) Act 2014	No. 80 of 2014	21 October 2014
Sentencing Amendment (Historical Homosexual Convictions Expungement) Act 2014	No. 81 of 2014	21 October 2014
An Act to amend the Sentencing Act 1991 to establish a scheme under which convictions for certain offences related to conduct engaged in for the purposes of, or in connection with, sexual activity of a homosexual nature may be expunged, to make consequential amendments to the Victorian Civil and Administrative Tribunal Act 1998 (Note: Victorian Civil and Administrative Tribunal Act 1998 (No. 53 of 1998)) and the Equal Opportunity Act 2010 (Note: Equal Opportunity Act 2010 (No. 16 of 2010)) and for other purposes.
Sex Offenders Registration Amendment Act 2014	No. 82 of 2014	21 October 2014
An Act to amend the Sex Offenders Registration Act 2004, (Note: Sex Offenders Registration Act 2004 (No. 56 of 2004)) the Children, Youth and Families Act 2005 (Note: Children, Youth and Families Act 2005 (No. 96 of 2005)) and the Freedom of Information Act 1982 and for other purposes.

== Sources ==
- "Acts as made: 2014". Victoria Legislation.
