= John Cain (41st Premier of Victoria) =

Australian politician (1931–2019)

The Honourable John Cain
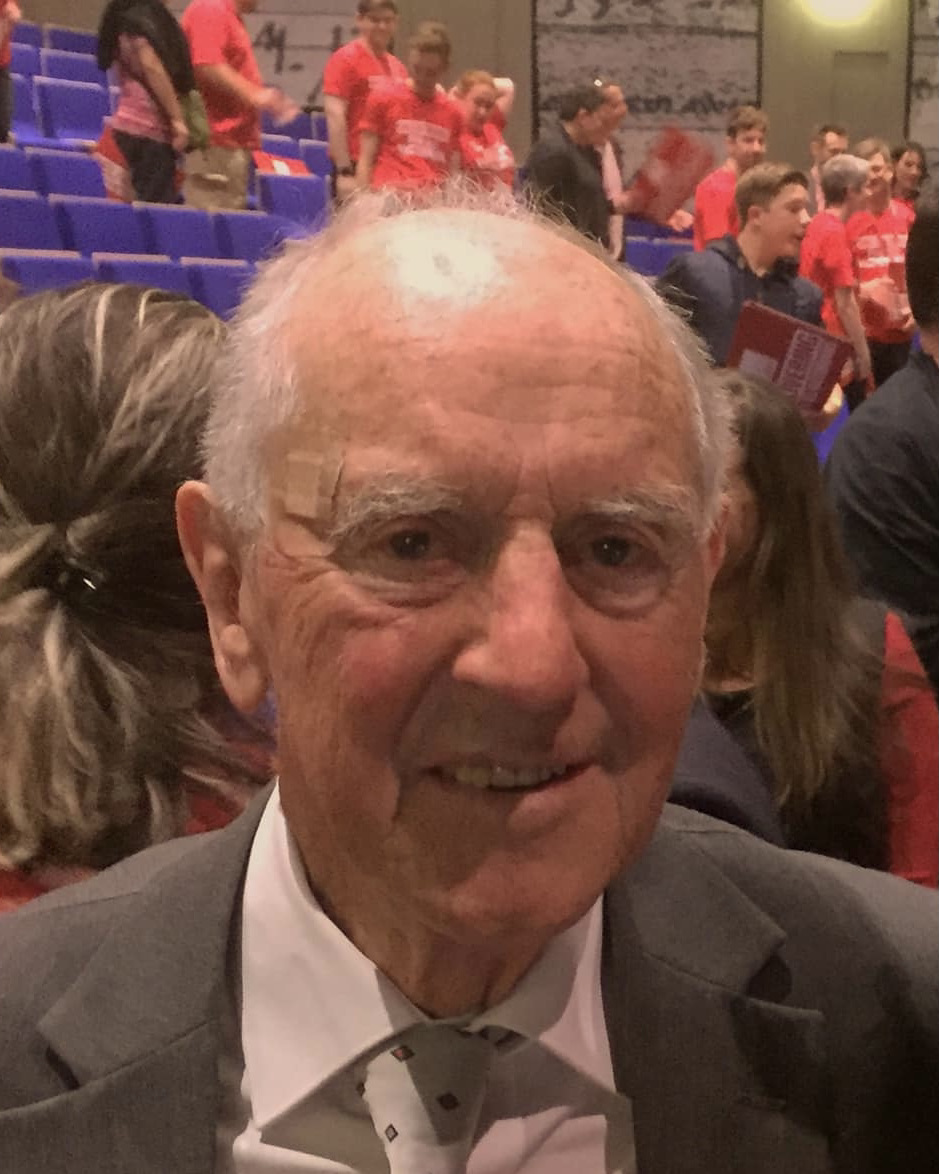
- Cain in 2018

41st Premier of Victoria
- In office 8 April 1982 – 10 August 1990
- Monarch: Elizabeth II
- Governor: Sir Brian Murray; Davis McCaughey
- Deputy: Robert Fordham; Joan Kirner
- Preceded by: Lindsay Thompson
- Succeeded by: Joan Kirner

Leader of the Opposition of Victoria
- In office 9 September 1981 – 8 April 1982
- Premier: Lindsay Thompson
- Deputy: Robert Fordham
- Preceded by: Frank Wilkes
- Succeeded by: Lindsay Thompson

Leader of the Labor Party in Victoria
- In office 9 September 1981 – 7 August 1990
- Deputy: Robert Fordham; Joan Kirner
- Preceded by: Frank Wilkes
- Succeeded by: Joan Kirner

Member of the Victorian Legislative Assembly for Bundoora
- In office 20 March 1976 – 14 August 1992
- Preceded by: Seat created
- Succeeded by: Sherryl Garbutt

Personal details
- Born: John Cain; 26 April 1931 Northcote, Victoria, Australia
- Died: 23 December 2019 (aged 88) Melbourne, Victoria, Australia
- Party: Labor Party
- Spouse: Nancye Evelyn Williams (m. 1955)
- Children: 3, including John
- Parent: John Cain (father)
- Education: University of Melbourne
- Profession: Barrister

John Cain (26 April 1931 – 23 December 2019) was an Australian politician and barrister who served as the 41st premier of Victoria from 1982 to 1990 and leader of the Victorian Labor Party from 1981 to 1990. He was the member of the Legislative Assembly (MP) for the district of Bundoora from 1972 to 1992.

Cain’s time as premier was marked by the introduction of reforms such as liberalised shop trading hours and liquor laws, equal opportunity initiatives, and occupational health and safety legislation.

== Early life ==
Cain was born in Northcote, Victoria, where his father, John Cain, the leader of the Australian Labor Party in Victoria from 1937 to 1957 and three times premier, was the local member. His mother ran a successful chain of millinery stores in the inner north of Melbourne.

He was educated at Bell Primary School, Northcote High School, Scotch College, and at the University of Melbourne, where he graduated in law in 1952. He practised law in suburban Melbourne, and was president of the Law Institute of Victoria in 1972–73. He was also a member of the Law Council of Australia and a member of the Australian Law Reform Commission.

Cain was 24 when the 1955 split in the Labor Party brought down his father's last government. He lost a preselection battle with Frank Wilkes for his father's seat of Northcote after his father died in 1957.

During the 1960s, he was a member of the group, known as The Participants, which also included John Button, Richard McGarvie, Frank Costigan and Barry Jones, who opposed the left-wing group which controlled the Victorian Labor Party from 1955 onwards. In 1971 he supported moves by supporters of Gough Whitlam, led by Bob Hawke and others, that in 1971 brought about federal intervention in the Victorian branch and ended left-wing control. He became vice-chairman of the Victorian Labor Party in 1973. That group of Participants later became known as the Independents faction which predominantly voted with the Socialist Left.

== Political career ==
In 1976, Cain was elected to the Victorian Legislative Assembly as MP for Bundoora. He became shadow Attorney-General under the leadership of Frank Wilkes. After Wilkes narrowly lost the 1979 election to the Liberal premier, Dick Hamer, Cain challenged him for the leadership, becoming leader in September 1981.

Hamer had been forced to resign a few months earlier and was succeeded by deputy premier Lindsay Thompson. However, the Liberals appeared tired and complacent after over a quarter-century in power, and Cain consistently got the better of Thompson. After waiting as long as he could, Thompson called an election for April 1982. At that election, Labor won a sweeping victory on a 17-seat swing—the worst defeat that a non-Labor government has ever suffered in Victoria. Cain took office at the helm of the first Labor government in Victoria since the one led by his father 27 years earlier.

=== First term as premier ===
During its first term, Cain's government carried out many reforms, particularly in the areas of education, environment, law reform and public administration. The Government brought in nude beaches, legalised many brothels, extended Saturday shop trading hours, extended nightclub hours, extended hotel hours, permitted football matches to take place on Sundays, and furnished more gambling opportunities.

Cain was a Keynesian, opposed to the doctrines of economic rationalism, and he increased government spending in the hope of stimulating growth and investment. Following the lead of Neville Wran (who had been New South Wales Premier since 1976), Cain demanded Government-owned enterprises pay dividends to the treasury. These dividends were increased every year, forcing these enterprises to borrow to pay the dividend. Other schemes such as the Victorian Economic Development Corporation, and the Victorian Equity Trust promised good returns. Such schemes worked so long as the national economy remained buoyant.

Controversially the Government of Victoria refused to approve the plans for the upgrade of VFL Park, because the upgrade would threaten the Melbourne Cricket Ground's right to host the VFL Grand Final. Cain, who had played Australian football at Scotch College, made sure that Waverley Park had no chance to succeed; accordingly the MCG remained the number one venue. Cain said that such a major event must be played in the centre of Melbourne, but his real reason for sabotaging Waverley Park was to look after the MCC. He saw his first VFL Grand Final with his father in 1942, and watched each one after that. He also kept the Australian Open in Melbourne by building the National Tennis Centre in Melbourne Park.

Cain forced exclusive male-only sporting clubs like the Melbourne Cricket Club and Victorian Racing Club (VRC) – private clubs on public lands – to accept women as full members. The VRC had notorious lines painted on the ground that women were forbidden to cross. He told the VRC that the lines had to go if the club was ever to receive any further government funding.

One of Cain's major achievements (and one in which he took especial pride) was the introduction of Victoria's Freedom of Information laws. No other state had passed such laws, though afterwards each state followed Victoria's lead.

Cain was also responsible for the appointment as Governor of Davis McCaughey, then aged 71, who served from 1986 to 1992. A highly respected theologian, McCaughey was a popular choice after the controversy surrounding the resignation of Rear Admiral Sir Brian Murray, who had been accused of having improperly accepted free air travel.

=== Second term ===
Historically, Labor had not been very successful in Victoria. However, Cain remained very popular with the Victorian electorate, and was easily elected to a second term in 1985 over the Liberals under Jeff Kennett, the first time a Labor government had been reelected in Victoria. Labor also won the Victorian Legislative Council seat of Nunawading after a tied vote forced the parties to draw from a hat to decide the winner, giving Labor control of the upper house for the first time ever. However, a fresh election was ordered by the Court of Disputed Returns after it was found that the Chief Electoral Officer should have cast deciding vote. The Liberals won the seat, and Labor lost its slim majority. Within a week the chairman of the Victorian Nuclear Disarmament Party lodged an official complaint about a deceptive NDP how to vote card handed out at the booths. It was claimed that Labor members were recognised handing out this card and that the allocation of preferences to the ALP on the card damaged the NDP.

During its second term Cain's government began to run into difficulties with the state budget. The stock market crash of 1987 created a crisis which forced the government to cut spending, alienating some trade union supporters. The State Bank of Victoria, in particular its merchant banking arm Tricontinental, ran up a huge portfolio of bad loans, without adequate fiduciary supervision.

Progress had created a vast amount of vacant inner-city land, with the introduction of containerisation in the shipping industry, the docks became inadequate for the new container ships. This made the docks within Victoria Dock obsolete as the principal docking area shifted closer to the mouth of the Yarra, and this was seen as a large urban blight by the Cain state government. The size of the Melbourne Docklands area meant that political influences were inescapable.

The Docklands was high on the government's agenda, however, the government at the time could not afford to initiate the investment for the project so the Docklands project stayed on the drawing board. There was a bid for the 1996 Olympic Games and another proposal was to turn the Docklands into a technology city known as the Multifunction Polis (MFP).

=== Third term ===
The Cain government was narrowly re-elected to a third term in 1988. The Liberals actually won a majority of the two-party vote. However, much of the Liberal margin was wasted on large majorities in their heartland. In contrast, Labor only lost one seat in the capital, and won enough marginal urban seats to cling to power by only two seats. Immediately after the election a huge shortfall in the government's workers' compensation scheme, WorkCare, was revealed.

The VEDC (Victorian Economic Development Corporation), established by the previous Liberal Government, and its sister, the Victorian Investment Corporation, were created to back new industries to replace outdated smokestack manufacturers. The VEDC collapsed under poor management and an absence of accountability after it had provided $450 million of loan and equity assistance to business.

This was followed by a budgetary crisis. The deputy premier, Robert Fordham, took some of the blame and resigned. This led to the elevation of Education Minister Joan Kirner to deputy premier.

For 33 days from 1 January 1990, 250 trams were parked in Melbourne's CBD streets by tram drivers. The Cain government wanted to save $24 million a year, by the introduction of a new Met Ticket system – or scratchies as they were colloquially known. Scratch tickets were supposed to save money by cutting 550 ticket conductor jobs and 550 train station staff. The trams did not move because the government shut down the power grid.

In February 1990, it was rumoured that Pyramid, a privately owned building society, was in difficulties. Ministers in Cain's government accepted assurances from Pyramid directors that the society's position was sound, and passed these assurances on to the public. In fact, it was insolvent. When it failed, causing thousands of investors and depositors to lose their money, the government was blamed by investors and the media. This was followed shortly after by the collapse of Tricontinental Bank, which threatened to bankrupt the Victorian Government-owned State Bank, Victoria's largest financial institution. The bank eventually had to be sold to the Commonwealth Bank, which was shortly thereafter privatised by the federal government.

By this time Cain was becoming frustrated at the reluctance of his government's caucus members to approve his plans for tax rises and spending cuts to reduce the growing budget deficit. He issued an ultimatum at the Labor Party Conference – "back me or sack me." When the undermining of his position continued, he resigned on 7 August 1990. During an interview after his resignation, he remarked, "We appointed a few dills but we weren't crook." Kirner was elected Labor leader in Cain's place and became the first female Premier of Victoria. By this time, Labor had bottomed out at 22 percent in opinion polling. Kirner was unable to make up the lost ground, and Labor was heavily defeated at the 1992 Victorian state election. Cain did not run in this election.

== Life after politics ==
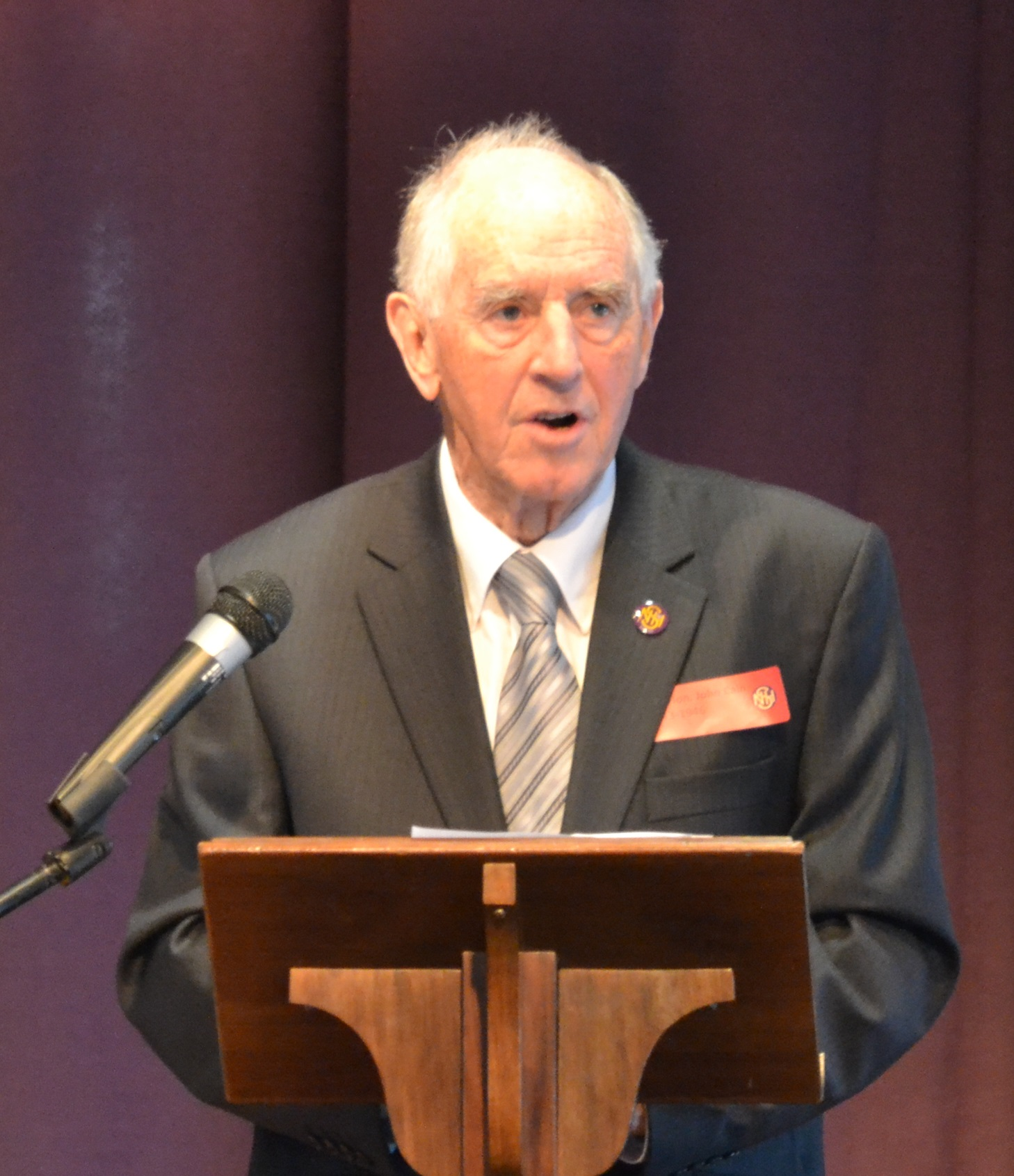
Cain in 2016

Cain did not seek publicity after his retirement from politics. He became a professorial fellow in politics at the University of Melbourne in 1991, and completed three books. In 2004 he surfaced in the media with a damning critique of the University of Melbourne's experimentation with what he said were risky financial ventures and what he argued was its departure from its public mission. Off Course: From Public Place to Marketplace at Melbourne University attracted a range of critical commentary. He was a regular political commentator on local radio. He remained active in the affairs of the Victorian Labor Party, and in 2011 he was critical of what he saw as the dominance of factions in the party, particularly the Labor Right.

John Cain sat on the board of the Melbourne Cricket Ground Trust. He was also a member of the Patrons Council of the Epilepsy Foundation of Victoria. The John Cain Foundation is a think tank on political affairs of relevance to Victoria

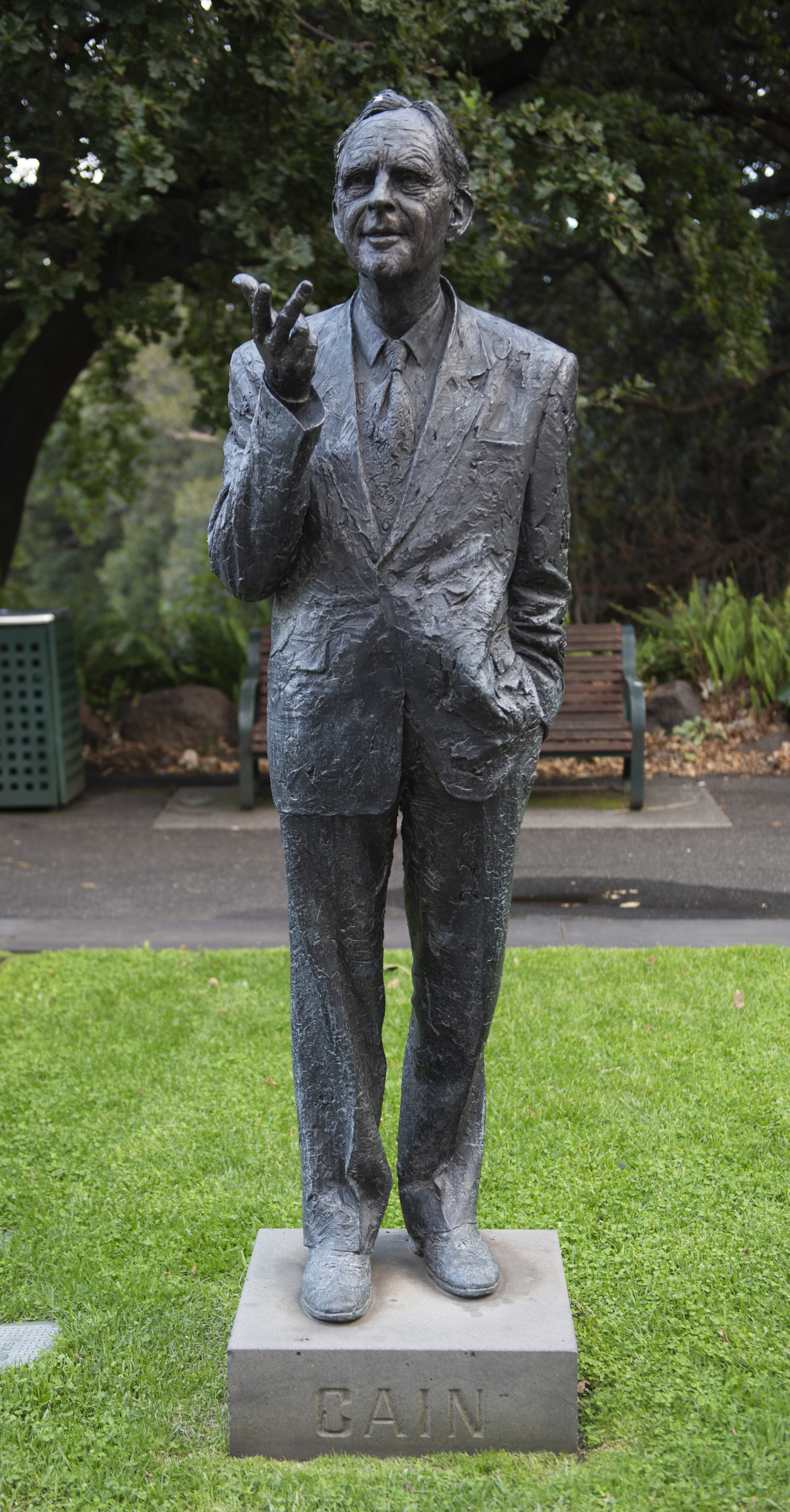
Cain's statue at 1 Treasury Place, Melbourne

== Personal life ==
Cain married Nancye Williams in 1955. He has two sons, John and James and a daughter, Joanne. Cain's son, also named John, is a judge of the County Court and also the State Coroner for Victoria.

Cain died on 23 December 2019, aged 88. He had suffered a severe stroke on 10 December and was being cared for at the Royal Melbourne Hospital. Cain remains the longest-lived Premier of Victoria.

He has a library named in his honour at Northcote High School, of which he was an alumnus.

A State Memorial Service for the Cain was held on 3 February 2020 at St Paul's Cathedral. On the same day, Victorian Premier Daniel Andrews announced that the Melbourne Multi Purpose Venue would be renamed "John Cain Arena" in recognition of the critical role that Cain played in keeping the Australian Open in Melbourne in the mid-1980s. The new name came into effect in December 2020.

== Books ==
- Cain, John (1995). John Cain's years : power, parties and politics. Carlton, Vic.: Melbourne University Press. ISBN 0-522-84615-7. OCLC 32532275.
- Cain, John (1998). On with the show : a glimpse behind the scenes of entertainment in Australia. Richmond, Vic.: Prowling Tiger Press. ISBN 0-9586647-3-0. OCLC 40500649.
- Cain, John (2004). Off course : from public place to marketplace at Melbourne University. John Hewitt. Melbourne: Scribe Publications. ISBN 1-920769-09-9. OCLC 54890583.

== See also ==
- Political families of Australia

Victorian Legislative Assembly
Seat created	Member for Bundoora; 1976–1992	Succeeded by Sherryl Garbutt
Political offices
Preceded by Frank Wilkes	Leader of the Opposition (Victoria); 1981–1982	Succeeded by Lindsay Thompson
Preceded by Haddon Storey	Attorney-General of Victoria; 1982–1983	Succeeded by Jim Kennan
Preceded by Lindsay Thompson	Premier of Victoria; 1982–1990	Succeeded by Joan Kirner
Party political offices
Preceded by Frank Wilkes	Leader of the Labor Party in Victoria; 1981–1990	Succeeded by Joan Kirner
