= Davis McCaughey =

Irish-born Australian theologian and university administrator

The Reverend Davis McCaughey AC

23rd Governor of Victoria
- In office 18 February 1986 – 22 April 1992
- Monarch: Elizabeth II
- Premier: John Cain; Joan Kirner
- Preceded by: Brian Murray
- Succeeded by: Richard McGarvie

Personal details
- Born: 12 July 1914 Belfast, Ireland
- Died: 25 March 2005 (aged 90) Melbourne, Victoria, Australia
- Spouse: Jean McCaughey
- Children: 5

John Davis McCaughey AC (12 July 1914 – 25 March 2005) was an Irish-born Australian academic theologian, Christian minister, university administrator and the 23rd Governor of Victoria from 1986 to 1992.

== Early life and academic career ==
McCaughey was born in Belfast, Ireland, on 12 July 1914. He was ordained a Presbyterian minister in 1941 and during the next decade he also worked for the British Council of Churches.

In 1953 the McCaughey family emigrated to Australia for him to become the Professor of New Testament Studies for the theological hall at Ormond College, University of Melbourne. He was Master of Ormond from 1957 to 1979. He served as Deputy Chancellor of the University of Melbourne in 1978 and 1979. He was also involved in the foundation of La Trobe University in the mid-1960s.

== Uniting Church in Australia ==
McCaughey was a key architect in the formation of the Uniting Church in Australia, which brought together many congregations of the Presbyterian Church of Australia, the Methodist Church of Australasia and the Congregational Union of Australia. He was the primary author behind the Basis of Union, the foundational theological document which led to the formation of the new denomination, and the president of the first assembly of the Uniting Church from 1977 to 1979.

== Governor of Victoria ==
In 1986, McCaughey was appointed as Governor of Victoria by the premier, John Cain, and served until 1992. He also served during the premiership of Joan Kirner.

McCaughey was not an Australian citizen at the time his appointment was announced in December 1985. He took up Australian citizenship in January 1986, prior to the start of his term as governor the following month.

McCaughey's approach to this largely symbolic vice-regal role differed from his predecessor, Sir Brian Murray. He opened Government House, Melbourne, to the public, exchanged the Rolls-Royce car for an Australian-made vehicle, flew business class instead of first class and dispensed with military aides de camp.

Cain said of McCaughey: "He was unassuming, down-to-earth, unfailingly courteous to everybody and unaffected by the trappings of the office." Kirner commented: "He was one of the few people who could bring common good and a broad sense of morality to life."

== Family ==
McCaughey married Jean in 1940, the year of his ordination as a minister. Their five children are the former National Gallery of Victoria director Patrick McCaughey, theatre director and classical scholar James McCaughey, primary school teachers Brigid McCaughey and Mary Nicholson, and director of the Astra Choir John McCaughey.

== Bibliography ==
- Imagination and the future: essays on Christian thought and practice presented to J. Davis McCaughey on his 65th birthday, edited by John A. Henley. (1980) Melbourne : Hawthorn Press,.
- Fresh words and deeds: the McCaughey papers (2004) edited by Peter Matheson & Christiaan Mostert, introduction by Harry Wardlaw, Melbourne, David Lovell

=== Television ===
McCaughey was a very early contributor to the new television medium in Australia. Discovering the Bible was an eight-part series presented by McCaughey about the meaning of the Bible. It was broadcast live in Melbourne and kinescoped/telerecorded for Sydney, these being the only Australian cities with television prior to 1959. The first episode aired in Melbourne on 6 July 1958 and the final episode aired on 26 October 1958 on ABV (Channel 2). It was aired in Sydney from 27 July 1958 to 2 November 1958 on ABN - channel 2.

=== Lectures ===
- Back to the drawing board: reflections on the idea of a university in Australia (1988)
- Biblical faith and secular obedience in a pluralist society: the inaugural Rollie Busch lecture at the University of Queensland on Friday 20 October 1989
- Christian hope: a lectured delivered at the annual conferment of degrees and diplomas by the Melbourne College of Divinity on 23 June 1954
- Inaugural addresses: the Uniting Church in Australia / by J. Davis McCaughey [and] Phillip Potter. [1977].
- "Piecing Together a Shared Vision" 1987 Boyer Lecture (1988) ABC Enterprises for the Australian Broadcasting Corporation, Crows Nest, N.S.W. ISBN 0-642-53091-2

=== Publications ===
- Christian obedience in the university; studies in the life of the Student Christian Movement of Great Britain and Ireland, 1930–1950. (1958)
- Commentary on the Basis of union of the Uniting Church in Australia (1980)
- Diversity and unity in the New Testament picture of Christ (1969)
- Gospel for our day (1978)
- Kingdom, church and world: five studies in St. Matthews gospel. (1963)
- New Delhi Assembly, World Council of Churches, November 1961: implications for the Australian churches. (1962).
- Piecing together a shared vision, 1987 Boyer Lecture (1988)
- Place of the university collegiate residence and its role in society 1980–2000
- Repining restlessnesse: diversity and dissent (1993)
- Teachings of Jesus for us today (1978)
- Tradition and dissent (1997) The Miegunyah Press at Melbourne University Press, Carlton, Vic ISBN 0-522-84764-1 (pbk)
- Joint
  - Ronald Frank Henderson 1917–1994: a tribute (with Jean McCaughey) (c1997)
  - Victoria's colonial governors, 1839–1900 (with Naomi Perkins and Angus Trumble) (1993) Carlton, Victoria Melbourne University Press at the Miegunyah Press.

Government offices
Preceded by Sir Brian Murray	Governor of Victoria; 1986–1992	Succeeded by Richard McGarvie
Religious titles
New title	President of the Assembly, Uniting Church in Australia; 1977–1979	Succeeded by Winston O'Reilly
