= Brian Murray (governor) =

Australian navy admiral and Governor of Victoria (1921–1991)

Rear Admiral Sir Brian Murray KCMG, AO

22nd Governor of Victoria
- In office 1 March 1982 – 3 October 1985
- Monarch: Elizabeth II
- Premier: Lindsay Thompson; John Cain
- Preceded by: Sir Henry Winneke
- Succeeded by: Davis McCaughey

Personal details
- Born: 26 December 1921 Glen Huntly, Victoria, Australia
- Died: 4 June 1991 (aged 69) Murrumbateman, New South Wales, Australia
- Spouse(s): Elizabeth Malcolmson (m. 1954; died 1962) Susan Hill-Douglas (m. 1965; ann. 1966) Janette Paris (m. 1973)
- Civilian awards: Knight Commander of the Order of St Michael and St George

Military service
- Allegiance: Australia
- Branch/service: Royal Australian Navy
- Years of service: 1939–1978
- Rank: Rear Admiral
- Commands: Deputy Chief of Naval Staff (1975–78); HMAS Sydney (1970); HMAS Supply (1967); HMAS Parramatta (1963); HMAS Queenborough (1961–62); HMAS Condamine (1954–55)
- Battles/wars: Second World War; Korean War; Vietnam War
- Military awards: Officer of the Order of Australia; Mentioned in Despatches

Rear Admiral Sir Brian Stewart Murray, KCMG, AO (26 December 1921 – 4 June 1991) was a senior officer in the Royal Australian Navy and the 22nd Governor of Victoria, serving from March 1982 until October 1985.

== Early life ==
Murray was born on 26 December 1921 in Glenhuntly, Victoria. He was the son of Lily Astria (née Fenton) and Alan Stewart Murray; his father was a surveyor and valuer. He attended Hampton High School, Melbourne.

== Naval career ==
Murray joined the Royal Australian Navy in 1939 as a cadet midshipman. He trained in England at the Royal Naval College, Dartmouth, and during World War II served in the Atlantic, Indian and Pacific Oceans as well as the North Sea. He was on board HMAS Australia during the invasion of Lingayen Gulf in January 1945, when a number of his crewmates were killed in kamikaze attacks by the Japanese.

Murray qualified as a navigating and air direction officer after the end of World War II. He was mentioned in despatches while aboard HMAS Sydney during the Korean War. He was promoted commander in 1955 and later served as executive officer to Otto Becher, the captain of aircraft carrier HMAS Melbourne. He was promoted captain in 1961 and commanded frigates HMAS Queenborough and HMAS Parramatta.

== Governor of Victoria ==
At the time of his appointment as governor, Murray was a retired Royal Australian Navy admiral married to a former nun. He was nominated by the Liberal Premier Lindsay Thompson. Labor Premier John Cain demanded his resignation in 1985 after Murray accepted a free trip to the United States with his wife from Continental Airlines. They retired to the Doonkuna Estate vineyard at Murrumbateman, outside of Canberra.

Flag of the governor of Victoria

During Murray's term of office, a Labor government was elected in Victoria for the first time since 1955. Accordingly, there were some changes to the role, ceremonial and functions within Government House, Melbourne during his incumbency. The new government discontinued recommending Imperial honours. On 18 April 1984, the governor announced that Queen Elizabeth II had approved a change in his flag:

From this day, the Governor's Personal Standard will be the State Flag of Victoria with the blue of the flag being replaced by gold. The new Standard will be flown at Government House and on vehicles conveying the Governor. The old Standard used by all Victorian Governors has been, since 1870, the Union Jack with the Badge of the State emblazoned in the centre thereof.

== Personal life ==
In 1954, Murray married Elizabeth Malcolmson, with whom he had three children. She died in 1962, months after the birth of their third child. In 1965, Murray remarried to Susan Hill-Douglas; the marriage was annulled the following year on the grounds of non-consummation. He married a third time in 1973 to Janette Paris, a schoolteacher and former Catholic nun.

Murray and his third wife owned a horsebreeding property at Murrumbateman, New South Wales, and also established a winery, Doonkuna Estate.

Murray died of cancer at Murrumbateman on 4 June 1991, aged 69. He was accorded the honour of a state funeral by the State of Victoria, complete with Royal Australian Navy escort, full naval honours and a eulogy by his friend Admiral Sir Anthony Synnot.

Military offices
Preceded by Rear Admiral Geoffrey Gladstone	Deputy Chief of Naval Staff; 1975–1978	Succeeded by Rear Admiral Neil McDonald
Government offices
Preceded by Sir Henry Winneke	Governor of Victoria; 1982–1985	Succeeded by Davis McCaughey
