= Law Institute of Victoria =

- Type: Bar association
- Headquarters: Level 13, 140 William Street, Melbourne
- Region served: Victoria
- Official language: English
- Chief Executive Officer: Adam Awty
- Website: http://www.liv.asn.au

The Law Institute Victoria (LIV) is a legal society in the Australian state of Victoria. It is the professional association for solicitors in Victoria, making rules to regulate their practice, and representing them to governments and other bodies. The institute was founded in 1859.

== History ==
On 22 March 1859, a group of 26 solicitors in Melbourne founded the institute at a meeting. The first president was David Ogilvy. From 1859, the institute's offices were located in Collins Street, and in 1883 the offices were relocated to the law courts complex in Lonsdale Street. In 1905, Flos Greig became the first woman to be admitted to practise as a solicitor in Victoria, and shortly after, was the first female member of the institute. In 1927, the first issue of the Law Institute Journal (LIJ) was published by the institute. In 1933, the institute became a constituent member of the newly formed Law Council of Australia.

In 1947, the Legal Profession Practice Act 1946, an act of the Parliament of Victoria, officially confirmed the institute's role as the regulating body for the legal profession in Victoria. By 1948, almost all solicitors in Victoria had become members of the institute. In 1961 the institute relocated to premises in Little Bourke Street, but after fire destroyed the building in 1978, the institute moved to 470 Bourke Street, a site which previously hosted the first meeting of the Victorian Legislative Council on 13 November 1851. In 2019 the LIV relocated its offices and member facilities to Level 13, 140 William Street.

In 1991, Gail Owen became the first female president of the institute. Former presidents of the institute include Alfred Brooks Malleson, Arthur Palmer Blake, John Gavan Duffy (brother of Frank and son of Charles), Sir Arthur Robinson, William Slater, Bernard Teague and John Cain II.

In 1996, the Legal Profession Practice Act 1946 was replaced by the Legal Practice Act 1996. In 2005, the Legal Practice Act 1996 was repealed and replaced by the Legal Profession Act 2004, the current legislation regulating the legal profession in Victoria.

John Cain, son of the 41st Premier of Victoria, John Cain, was CEO from 2002 to 2006.

After John Cain, Michael Brett Young was CEO for eight years until 2015, when he was replaced by Nerida Wallace. Wallace left the role of CEO in July 2018 and was replaced by Adam Awty, who had previously spent 18 years at CPA Australia, who worked in an interim role from July until October when they were appointed to the position on a permanent basis. In May 2021 Awty, whilst still CEO, joined the board of legalsuper, a superannuation fund for the Australian legal profession.

In 2019 the LIV published: Solicitors and the Law Institute In Victoria 1835-2019: Pathway To A Respected Profession, by legal history scholar and author, Simon Smith.

== Law Institute Journal ==
The Law Institute Journal (LIJ) is a bi-monthly legal journal published by the institute. It carries information about changes to the rules of practice, and the rules of the courts, as well as general commentary on legal issues. The first issue was published in July 1927.

== Arms ==
Coat of arms of Law Institute of Victoria
Notes Granted 20 June 1961 Crest Issuant from a wreath of the colours a dexter hand couped at the wrist Proper clasping a book bound in calf also Proper edged Or. Escutcheon Per chevron Gules and Azure in chief a pair of scales between two quill pens Or and in base a representation of the constellation of the Southern Cross Argent. Supporters On either side the figure of a woman that on the dexter representing Justice blindfolded and vested Proper holding in the exterior hand a sheathed sword point downwards Or and that on the sinister wearing a Phrygian cap and vested Proper holding in the exterior hand a charter rolled and sealed representing Liberty all also Proper. Motto Justitia Et Libertas
