= Alan Loxton =

- Born: 1920; Sydney Australia
- Died: 2004 (aged 83–84); Turramurra, New South Wales
- Education: Newington College; The Scots College; University of Sydney
- Occupation: Solicitor
- Title: Alan Loxton A.M.
- Spouse: Dorothy née Short (m. 1946)
- Children: 3 sons 1 daughter
- Parent: Dr E H Loxton

Alan Hamilton Loxton (13 April 1920 – 29 March 2004) was the senior partner at Allen, Allen and Hemsley, Australia's oldest law firm, President of the Law Society of New South Wales and a company director.

== Early life ==
Loxton was born in Sydney and educated at Newington College (1931–1933), The Scots College, and the University of Sydney, where he graduated in Law in 1949. He was a resident of St. Andrew's College, Sydney during his university years.

== War service ==
Loxton served with the Second Australian Imperial Force during World War II (1940–1945) rising to the rank of lieutenant in the 2nd/18th Battalion. He was a prisoner of war in Malaya (1942–1945).

== Legal career ==
In 1949, Loxton commenced practising as a solicitor at Allen, Allen & Hemsley and became a partner in 1951. From 1973 until 1975, Loxton was president of the Law Society of New South Wales.

== Club membership ==
From 1987 to 1990 Loxton was President of the Australian Club in Sydney.

== Company directorships ==
Loxton was a director of various public companies:

- AMEV Finance Ltd.
- Noble Lowndes International Holdings Pty., Ltd.

== Educational governance ==
Loxton was on the boards of various educational institutions:

- Chairman, Unisearch Ltd (1977–1985)
- Council member, University of New South Wales (1977–1985)
- Council member, Ku-ring-gai College of Advanced Education (1977–1982)
- Chairman, Sydney College of Law (1975–1982)
- Member, Solicitor's Admission Board (1971–1973)

== Honours ==
- Member of the Order of Australia (1991) for service to education and the law
