= John Cain (lawyer) =

Australian lawyer

State Coroner of Victoria
- In office 2 December 2019 – 31 August 2025
- Appointed by: Governor of Victoria
- Preceded by: Sara Hinchey
- Succeeded by: Liberty Sanger

Personal details
- Born: John Cain
- Parent: John Cain (father)
- Relatives: John Cain (grandfather)
- Education: Monash University
- Occupation: Lawyer, judge

John Cain is an Australian lawyer who has acted as the Government Solicitor for the State of Victoria, the solicitor for Public Prosecutions in Victoria, and State Coroner of Victoria. He is the son of John Cain, the 41st Premier of Victoria, and grandson of John Cain, the 34th.

== Education and career ==
Cain studied law and economics at Monash University.

Cain started work at Maurice Blackburn in 1982, becoming a partner in 1987 and Managing Partner in 1992, a position that he held until 2002 when he became CEO of the Law Institute of Victoria. He was in that position from 2002 to 2006 until he was appointed as Victorian Government Solicitor from 2006 to 2011 which included representing the Victorian Government at the 2009 Victorian Bushfires Royal Commission, arguing in 2010 that the book Snouts In The Trough: A True Story Of The Underworld And The Brotherhood Behind The Badge by Andrew Fraser breached suppression orders and identified several informers and, also in 2010, was briefed about Nicola Gobbo's role as a police informer ahead of the settlement of her civil claim.

In November 2015 Cain became Victoria's Solicitor for Public Prosecution. Cain was subsequently appointed as State Coroner for Victoria and a Judge of the County Court of Victoria on 2 December 2019.

Court offices
Preceded by Sara Hinchey	State Coroner of Victoria; 2019–2025	Succeeded by Liberty Sanger
