= Australian and New Zealand Law and History Society =

The Australian and New Zealand Law and History Society was founded in 1993 and is a learned society for legal historians. Its membership is based primarily in Australia and New Zealand, and includes professional and academic historians as well as lawyers. Its main function is to organise an annual legal history conference, and it also publishes occasional journals, most recently the Australian and New Zealand Law and History Society e-Journal.
