= College of Law (Australia) =

The College of Law
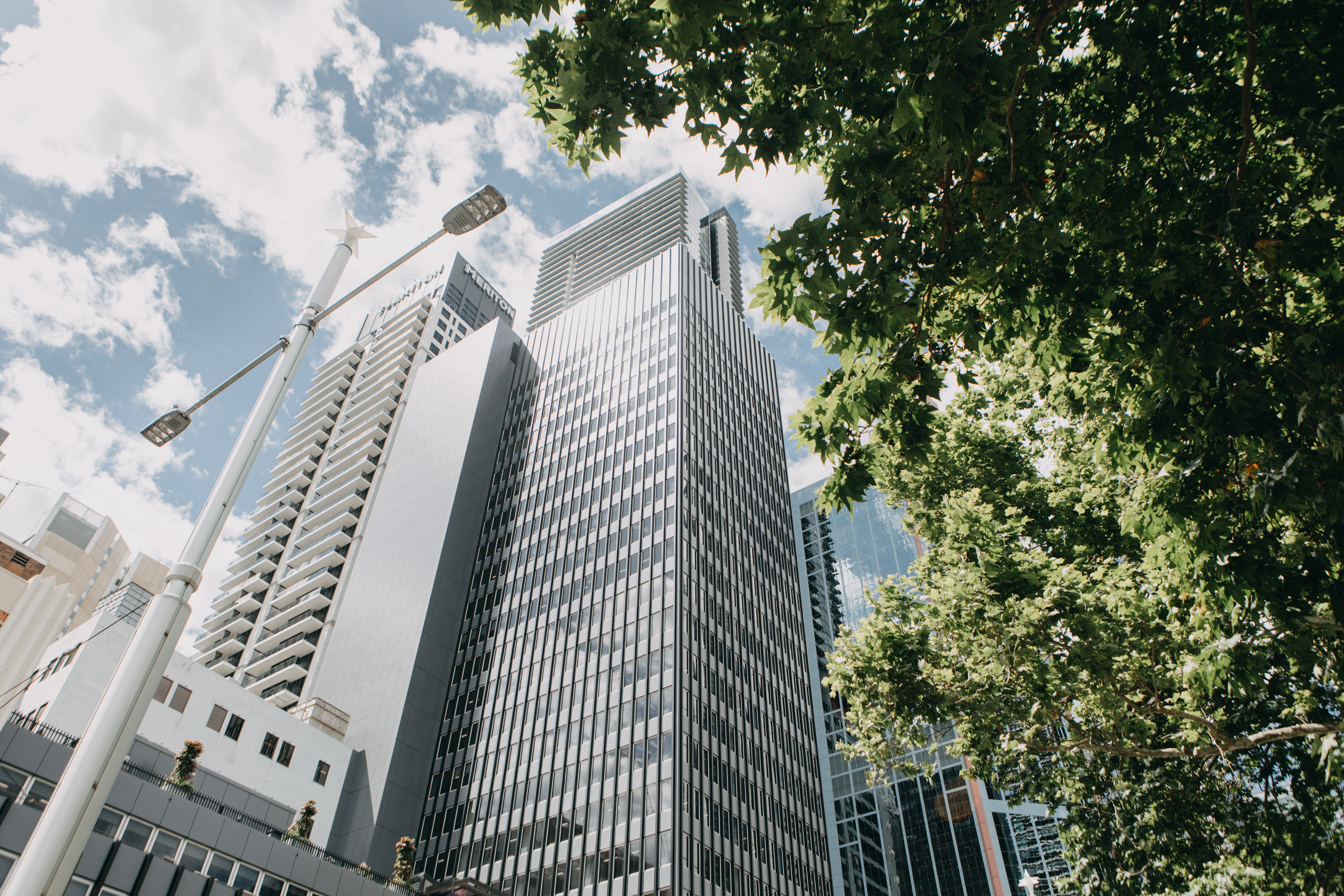
- The College's headquarters in George St, Sydney

Location
- 570 George Street, Sydney, NSW 2000; Sydney; New South Wales, 2000; Australia
- 33.874040°S 151.207280°E

Information
- Funding type: Private, not-for-profit
- Established: 1974
- Founder: Law Society of New South Wales
- Oversight: Tertiary Education Quality and Standards Agency; New Zealand Qualifications Authority
- Chairman: Joseph Catanzariti
- Principal: Marcus Martin
- Staff: 400
- Campuses: Sydney; Melbourne; Brisbane; Perth; Adelaide; Auckland
- Alumni: 100,000
- Website: collaw.edu.au

The College of Law is a school of professional practice for lawyers in Australia and New Zealand, based in Sydney, Australia. Founded in 1974, they are now the largest provider of practice-focused legal education in Australasia.

== History ==
The College of Law was founded as a subsidiary of the Law Society of New South Wales in 1974. Established as a charitable trust for educational purposes, the College was to provide practical legal training (PLT) to qualify law graduates for admission as lawyers (replacing the former articles of clerkship), as well as continuing legal education for the needs of legal practitioners in New South Wales.

From 1977 to 1995, the College operated as a school within the aegis of the Ku-ring-gai College of Advanced Education, and then as part of the University of Technology, Sydney (UTS). At the end of 1995, the College became an autonomous education provider within the evolving higher education regulatory regime of New South Wales.

In 2002, the College was registered as a Higher Education Provider (HEP) and the Graduate Diploma of Legal Practice (PLT Program) was accredited. In 2005, College was approved as a Higher Education Provider (HEP) for Fee-Help purposes under the Higher Educations Support Act (HESA) 2003.

Branches in Australian state capitals and New Zealand were opened progressively from 2005 onwards.

In 2006, the College introduced the Graduate Diploma of In-house Legal Practice, which was developed in partnership with the Australian Corporate Lawyers Association (now part of the Association of Corporate Counsel). In 2007, the College had its first master's degree accredited – the Master of Applied Law (Family Law). The Master of Applied Law (Commercial Litigation) was accredited in 2008, and further master's degrees in Wills & Estates, and In-house Practice were added in 2010. The Graduate Diploma of Family Dispute Resolution was accredited in 2014.

In 2009, the College separated from the Law Society to become a stand-alone, not-for-profit entity. In December 2015 the College was awarded Self Accrediting Authority (SAA) by the Tertiary Education Quality & Standards Agency (TEQSA).

In 2016, the College established its own research centre, the Centre for Legal Innovation (CLI).

Also in 2016, the College established an office in Kuala Lumpur, Malaysia, as its Asia headquarters. In November 2017, the College signed an agreement with the Inter-Pacific Bar Association to establish a co-branded master's program. The Master of Laws (Applied Law) in ASEAN+6 Legal Practice commenced in February 2018.

The organisation has grown to become largest provider of practical legal training in Australia and New Zealand. As of 2016 the college claimed more than 100,000 graduates, with more than 50,000 of these in New South Wales. In 2016, annual enrolments in the College's award programs in Australia exceeded 5,000.

== Courses ==
In addition to the Practical Legal Training (PLT) program — which is the prerequisite program for practising law in Australia or New Zealand — the College offers the LLM (Applied Law) and other postgraduate applied law programs, as well as Continuing Professional Development (CPD) short courses for lawyers, in the following specialisations:

- Business law and transactions
- Commercial litigation
- Dispute resolution and mediation
- Family law
- Government and public sector law
- In-house practice
- Legal practice management
- Property law
- Wills and estates
- Estate planning

== Structure ==
A public company limited by guarantee, the College of Law Limited is regulated by the Australian Charities and Not-For-Profits Commission. In Australia, the College is a Self-Accrediting Authority recognised by the Tertiary Education Quality and Standards Agency (TEQSA). In New Zealand, the College is accredited by the New Zealand Qualifications Authority, which rated the College "Highly Confident" in its educational performance.

As of July 2025, the Chief Executive Officer and Principal is Marcus Martin. As of March 2016, the chair of the College of Law is Joseph Catanzariti.

== Publications ==
The College produces a series of textbooks to support its PLT training, known as the Practice Papers, which are self-published. Covering a number of core practice areas, the Practice Papers also serve as practical guides for lawyers in their early years of practice. From 1983 to 1998, the College published The Journal of Professional Legal Education on behalf of the Australian Professional Legal Education Conference.

== Notable people ==
Honorary fellows of the college include Federal Court court justice John Dowsett and former Australian Human Rights Commission president Gillian Triggs.
