= Legal Profession Act 2004 =

Victorian legislation regulating legal profession

Parliament of Victoria
- Long title: An Act to improve the regulation of the legal profession, principally by implementing national model provisions for the regulation of the profession and establishing new bodies responsible for regulating it, to facilitate the regulation of legal practice on a national basis across State and Territory borders, to repeal the Legal Practice Act 1996, to make consequential amendments to Acts and for other purposes.
- Citation: No. 99 of 2004
- Royal assent: 14 December 2004

Repeals
- Legal Practice Act 1996

Repealed by
- Legal Profession Uniform Law Application Act 2014
- Status: Repealed

The Legal Profession Act 2004 (No. 99 of 2004) was an act of the Parliament of Victoria which outlined the accreditation requirements for the legal profession in the Australian state of Victoria.

It was repealed by the Legal Profession Uniform Law Application Act 2014 (No. 17 of 2014).
